= Trixie (slang) =

US slang term

Trixie is a generally derogatory slang term referring to a young urban white woman, typically single and in her 20s or early 30s. The term originated during the 1990s in Chicago, Illinois, with a popular satirical website dedicated to the Lincoln Park Trixie Society, a fictional social club based in Chicago's upscale Lincoln Park neighborhood.

== Concept ==
Trixies are described as "social climbing, marriage-minded, money-hungry young ladies that seem to flock to the upwardly-mobile neighborhood of Lincoln Park". Another description states that "every town has its Trixies. They're the women with Kate Spade bags for every day of the week; the ex-sorority girls still lusting after big, dumb jocks; the women who go to law school to find husbands." The stereotypical counterparts of Trixies, and the men they usually end up marrying, are referred to in slang as Chads.

Shane DuBow of National Geographic, reporting about the Lincoln Park Trixie Society website, wrote that the Trixie stereotype describes a "blond, late-twenties woman with a ponytail who works in PR or marketing, drives a black Jetta, gets manicures and no-foam skim lattes", noticing that the website looked like a straight-faced parody.

The term Trixie was used by some Chicago businesses: a salad being named the "Trixie Salad" at a Chicago restaurant, and a hair salon named the Trixie Girl Blow Dry Bar.

== See also ==
- Airhead (subculture)
- Becky (slang)
- Bimbo
- Chav
- Dumb blonde
- Essex girl
- Ganguro
- Karen (slang)
- Kogal
- Pixie
- Paninaro
- Sloane Ranger
- Trixie Mattel
- Valley girl
- Yuppie
