= Mimbo =

Mimbo may refer to:

- A male Bimbo, now referred to as a Himbo
- Palm wine in Cameroonian English
