= Chad (slang) =

American slang term

The "Gigachad" meme

Chad is a slang term for a type of young man. In the 2000s, it was used in Chicago as a derogatory description for young, upper-class, urban males. In modern internet slang, the term generally refers to a masculine white male, that being an "alpha", or simply a sexually successful male.

== Chicago slang ==
In the 2000s, the term "Chad" was used in Chicago as a derogatory way to describe a young, wealthy man from the city's northern suburbs, typically single and in his twenties or early thirties. Chicago's Chads were covered by a satirical website dedicated to the Lincoln Park Chad Society, a fictional social club based in the city's upscale Lincoln Park neighborhood.

The female equivalent of a Chad in Chicago slang is a "Trixie".

== Manosphere, incels, and internet use ==
The 2010s meaning of the term has come into use in incel forums and as internet slang to refer to sexually active, supposedly genetically superior men, or "alpha males". Within the manosphere and internet culture, Chads are generally viewed as constituting the top decile in terms of genetic fitness. In online animation drawings in the manosphere, a Chad is often depicted as a muscular blond man with very pronounced masculine features. One such depiction, in the "Virgin vs. Chad" internet meme that originated from the /r9k/ board on 4chan in 2017, contrasts an introverted and insecure "Virgin" who acts normal, compared to a muscular and egotistical "Chad" who acts absurdly and over the top.

Chads are sometimes portrayed as the opposite to "omega" or "beta" males, and as physically attractive. The term Chad is sometimes used interchangeably with "slayer". Due to their characterization as being genetically gifted and privileged—though sometimes depicted as shallow, air-headed, arrogant, and overtly sexual—the term Chad is used in both a pejorative and complimentary way on incel forums and on the internet as a whole. Alongside the "Chad" being the essence of a white male, variations of Chad for other racial groups exist.

The black counterpart to a Chad is a "tyrone", while the east Asian variant is a "Chang", the Indian version is "Chadpreet" and the middle Eastern counterpart is "Chaddam".

The female counterpart to a Chad in Internet usage is a "Stacy".

=== Online memes ===
The term was used in a 2013 viral meme after appearing on the online messaging board 4chan under the name "Chad Thundercock". Chad is described as a heterosexual, white male, usually blond-haired, who is gainfully employed, athletic, sexually active, and well-endowed.

=== Gigachad ===
"Gigachad" is a related internet meme dating back to 2016 that uses black-and-white photographs of a muscular male model photographed by Krista Sudmalis, as part of her Sleek'n'Tears art project. It is used to assert one's opinion as that of "the ultimate alpha who can never be wrong", or with a sense that confidence is more important than accuracy.

== See also ==
- Basic (slang)
- Becky (slang)
- Benny (slang)
- Essex man
- Frat boy
- Himbo
- Jock (stereotype)
- Karen (slang)
- Metrosexual
- Preppy
- Rah (slang)
- Sigma male
- Yuppie
