= Basic (slang) =

American slang term

"Basic" is a slang term in American popular culture, used pejoratively to describe culturally unoriginal people, particularly young women, who are perceived to prefer products, trends, and music that will make them look upper class even though they are not. "Basic bitch" originated in hip hop culture and rose in popularity through rap music, songs, blogs, and videos from 2011 to 2014. The male counterpart can often be put under the "bro" label.

Similar labels to "basic bitch" or "airhead" in other English-speaking countries include: contemporary British, "Essex girls" and "Sloane Rangers"; and Australian, "haul girls", known for their love of shopping for designer gear, and uploading videos of their purchases on YouTube.

== History ==
=== Origins ===
Before the 1980s, "airhead" was general American slang for a ditzy, clumsy or stupid person. With the rise of the valley girl and preppy subculture however, the term was applied to cheerleaders and nouveau riche or middle class hangers-on who imitated the uptalk speech and clothing of the upper class popular girls. These airheads, material girls or gold diggers were stereotypically viewed by their classmates as unintelligent, gossipy bimbettes who were interested solely in spreading rumors about their rivals and entering relationships with the wealthy jocks.

=== 1990s and 2000s ===
"Basic" was used as a person descriptor in 1992 on the show The Wonder Years and in 1994 on ReBoot.

During the late 1990s and early 2000s, airheads began to be regarded as a distinct, middle class subculture in many suburban American high schools, although appearance-wise they initially differed little from the traditionalist upper class preps. At the time, many wealthy white jocks and younger preppies had begun imitating urban fashion trends, eschewing the semi-formal conservative look of the 1980s and 1990s in favor of gold bling, expensive designer clothes, sneakers, dark jeans, and sweatpants. Rich girls who dressed this way were known as Queen Bees and their followers were known as plastics, or airheads. Members of this clique believed their designer clothing, as a manifestation of conspicuous consumption, was key to being popular.

The term basic bitch was coined in 2009 by comedian Lil' Duval. Over the next two years, it appeared in several American rap songs. In the songs "Hard in the Paint" by Tyga and "I'm not a Human Being" by Lil Wayne, the singers insist that they are not basic bitches, while in the song "Basic Bitch" by the Game, the singer warns others to avoid basic bitches because they are fake.

=== 2010s ===
In 2011, rapper Kreayshawn debuted her song "Gucci Gucci", which included the chorus: "Gucci Gucci, Louis Louis, Fendi Fendi, Prada ... basic bitches wear that shit so I don't even bother." In 2014 CollegeHumor released a parody video of a wife being diagnosed by a doctor as a "basic bitch", to the horror of her husband.

== Fashion and stereotypes ==
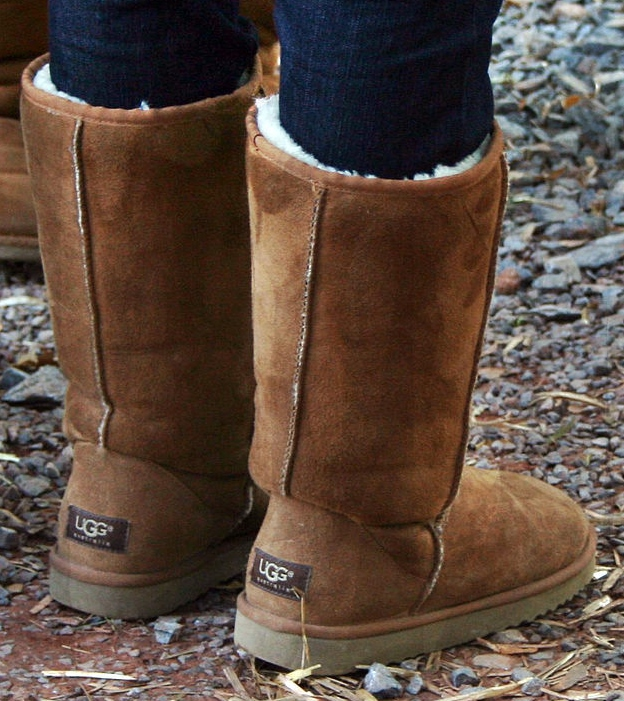
Ugg boots, often referenced in songs and articles about cultural trends as a brand of footwear loved by so-called "basic" women

From the 1990s until the early 2010s, both boys and girls from the popular clique often combined budget preppy clothes with supposedly edgy elements of mainstream hip hop fashion, in imitation of the outfits worn by early adopter black rappers such as Kanye West. Miniskirts, Nike brand sneakers, pastel colors like pale blue or baby pink, expensive Aeropostale, Hollister Co. or Abercrombie and Fitch clothes, designer clothes or accessories purchased by one's parents, grey marl sweatpants, crop tops, white Converse sneakers, leggings, and Ugg boots remained common among American airheads, Aussie haul girls and Essex girls during the 2010s. Other items of clothing formerly fashionable in the 1990s, such as polo shirts with popped collars, have gone out of style. Common amongst this subculture is a love of brunch (often with Prosecco) and sweet, modern cocktails such as porn star martinis.

Popular girls in Britain, Australia, New Zealand, the United States and Canada are often accused of meanness, gossip, snobbery, narrowmindedness, homophobia, intolerance, flaunting their apparent wealth, backstabbing, shallowness, body shaming, slut shaming, contempt for the poor, and openly bullying other girls to maintain their own privileged position.

== Interpretations and criticism ==
Referring to an object or a person as "basic" has a variety of connotations. When used to refer to people, it can mean a criticism of shallow materialism; in songs that use the term, popular luxury brands like Gucci and Prada are referenced to suggest that the people who wear them are buying, rather than earning, their fashionability and social status. Decrying the basic bitch's love of bland, boring products like Ugg boots and Starbucks pumpkin spice lattes is a rhetorical technique that allows the singer to appear cooler by comparison.

In an article in The Guardian titled "Why I'm proud to be a 'basic bitch'", British journalist Daisy Buchanan criticizes the cultural trend of using "basic bitch" as an insult, pointing out that those who label other women as basic bitches are "dismissing all cultural feminine signifiers" and "mak[ing] assumptions about a woman's interests and habits based on her sex". The implication of this claim is that material possessions and consumption are, in fact, markers of femininity. Widespread usage of the term to mock the behavior and interests of girlfriends or wives "conforms to the most bland and uncreative stereotypes of late capitalist femininity" and suggests a misogynistic attitude toward all women, according to Michael Reid Roberts in an article in The American Reader.

== In the media ==
Since the 1980s, the airhead or popular clique have often been cast as the antagonists in high school and teen movies. Examples include Valley Girl, The Clique, Heathers, Girl Fight, A Cinderella Story, Odd Girl Out, Frenemies, Pretty in Pink, Mean Girls, and Clueless.

The sitcom The Good Place (2016–2020), which takes place in a fictional afterlife, famously popularized the phrase when the main character Eleanor Shellstrop (played by Kristen Bell) comically told her boyfriend "Face it Chidi: ya basic!" In a later season, the character Michael (played by Ted Danson) uses the same epithet against two other characters. The show then satirized the then-common confusion about the term as Michael then finds himself having to explain what "basic" means ("It's devastating. You're devastated right now.") when the other two are completely unaware of the term.

== See also ==
- Himbo
- Normcore
- Becky (slang)
- Valley girl
- VSCO girl
