= Essex girl =

UK stereotype

Location of Essex in England, immediately northeast of London

The term Essex girl, when used as a pejorative stereotype in the United Kingdom, applies to a woman who is viewed as promiscuous and unintelligent, which are characteristics jocularly attributed to women from the county of Essex, England. It is applied widely throughout the country and has gained popularity over time, dating from the 1980s and 1990s.

== Negative stereotype ==
The stereotypical image formed as a variation of the dumb blonde/bimbo persona, with references to the Estuary English accent, white stiletto heels, mini skirts, silicone-augmented breasts, peroxide blonde hair, over-indulgent use of fake tan (lending an orange appearance), promiscuity, loud verbal vulgarity, and socialising at downmarket nightclubs, considered to be inexpensive and less prestigious.

Time magazine recorded:

In the typology of the British, there is a special place reserved for Essex Girl, a lady from London's eastern suburbs who dresses in white strappy sandals and suntan oil, streaks her hair blond, has a command of Spanish that runs only to the word Ibiza, and perfects an air of tarty prettiness. Victoria Beckham – Posh Spice, as she was – is the acknowledged queen of that realm ...

== Challenging the stereotype ==
In 2004, Bob Russell, Liberal Democrat MP for Colchester in Essex, appealed for debate in the House of Commons on the issue, encouraging a boycott of The People tabloid, which has printed several derogatory references to girls from Essex.

The Essex Women's Advisory Group was set up in 2010 to combat the negative stereotyping of girls living in Essex by supporting Essex-based women's charities helping those in need as well as by funding projects that promote women's and girls' learning and success in science, technology, the arts, sports and business. The charitable fund is administered by the Essex Community Foundation.

On 6 October 2016, Juliet Thomas and Natasha Sawkins of The Mother Hub launched a campaign on social media to draw attention to the negative definition of Essex girl in the Oxford English Dictionary and Collins Dictionary. Their main goal was to raise awareness and to open a dialogue around the derogatory "Essex girl" stereotype. Their campaign centred on changing the definition of "Essex girl" to "a girl from or living in Essex" by encouraging women to use the hashtag #IAmAnEssexGirl and included a petition to change or remove the dictionary definitions. The campaign reached the national press. In December 2020, after campaigning by the Essex Girls Liberation Front, the Oxford Advanced Learner’s Dictionary, used to teach non-native English speakers, removed the term.

== See also ==
- Chavette
- Airhead (subculture)
- Ah Lian
- Essex man
- Valley girl
- Trixie
- The Only Way Is Essex
- Educating Essex
