= Karen (slang) =

Pejorative term and meme

Karen is a pejorative slang term typically used to refer to a middle class woman who is perceived as entitled or excessively demanding. The term is often portrayed in memes depicting middle-class white women who use their white and class privilege to demand their own way. Depictions include demanding to "speak to the manager", being racist, or wearing a particular bob cut hairstyle. It was popularized in the aftermath of the Central Park birdwatching incident in 2020, when a woman called the police during a disagreement over the requirement for her dog to be leashed in an area of the park.

The term has been criticized by some as racist, sexist, ageist, classist, and controlling women's behavior. The term has occasionally been applied to male behavior.

During 2020, the term increasingly appeared in media and social media, including during the COVID-19 pandemic and George Floyd protests. The Guardian called 2020 "the year of Karen".

== Origin ==
In African-American culture, there is a history of calling difficult white women or those who "weaponize" their position by a generic pejorative name. In the antebellum era (1815–1861), "Miss Ann" was used. In the early 1990s, "Becky" was used. As late as 2018, before the use of "Karen" caught on, alliterative names matching particular incidents were used, such as "Barbecue Becky", "Cornerstore Caroline", and "Permit Patty". Linguist Kendra Calhoun connects "Karen" stereotypes to the older "soccer mom".

For the term "Karen", several possible origins have been proposed. Early uses of Karen as a joke punchline include the airheaded character Karen (played by Amanda Seyfried) from the 2004 film Mean Girls, Dane Cook's 2005 sketch "The Friend Nobody Likes" on his album Retaliation, and a 2016 Internet meme regarding a woman in an ad for the Nintendo Switch console who exhibits perceived antisocial behavior and is given the nickname "antisocial Karen". In December 2017, Karen memes regarding entitled women went viral on Reddit, the earliest being from user karmacop9, who ranted about his ex-wife Karen taking custody of their children. The posts led to the creation of the subreddit r/FuckYouKaren, containing memes about the posts, and inspiring spinoffs including r/karen and r/EntitledKarens dedicated to criticizing Karens.

A more pointed explanation, which involves race, is the expression originating among black people to refer to unreasonable white women. The term was popularized on Black Twitter as a meme used to describe white women who "tattle on Black kids' lemonade stands" or who unleash the "violent history of white womanhood". Bitch magazine described Karen as a term that originated with black women but was co-opted by white men. In an article on high-profile incidents in the U.S. of white women calling the police on black people, The Guardian called 2020 "the year of Karen".

== Meaning and use ==
Kansas State University professor Heather Suzanne Woods, whose research interests include memes, said that a Karen's defining characteristics are a sense of entitlement, a willingness and desire to complain, and a self-centered approach to interacting with others. According to Woods, a Karen "demands the world exist according to her standards with little regard for others, and she is willing to risk or demean others to achieve her ends". Rachel Charlene Lewis, writing for Bitch, agrees, saying that a Karen does not view others as individuals and instead moves "through the world prepared to fight a faceless conglomerate of lesser-than people who won't give her what she wants and feels she deserves".

The meme carries several stereotypes, the most notable being that a Karen will demand to "speak to the manager" of a hypothetical service provider. Other stereotypes include anti-vaccination beliefs, racism, excessive use of Facebook, and a particular bob haircut with blond highlights. Pictures of Kate Gosselin and Jenny McCarthy's bob cut are often used to depict a Karen, and their bobs are sometimes called the "can-I-speak-to-your-manager?" haircut.

According to Apryl Williams of the University of Michigan, the memes "actively call out white supremacy and call for restitution".

=== Racial context ===
Time called the Karen meme "Internet shorthand ... for a particular kind of racial violence white women have instigated for centuries—following a long and troubling legacy of white women in the country weaponizing their victimhood". The Time article states,

The historical narrative of white women’s victimhood goes back to myths that were constructed during the era of American slavery. Black slaves were posited as sexual threats to the white women, the wives of slave owners; in reality, slave masters were the ones raping their slaves. This ideology, however, perpetuated the idea that white women, who represented the good and the moral in American society, needed to be protected by white men at all costs, thus justifying racial violence towards Black men or anyone that posed a threat to their power. This narrative that was the overarching theme of Birth of a Nation, the 1915 film that was the first movie to be shown at the White House, and is often cited as the inspiration for the rebirth of the KKK.

University of Virginia media researcher Meredith Clark has said that the idea of a white woman in the vicinity of whom black people feel a need to be careful because she would not hesitate to use her "privilege" at the expense of others "has always been there; it just hasn't always been so specific to one person's name". Karen Grigsby Bates agrees that Karen is part of a succession of characters like Miss Ann and Becky, adding that the concept of Karen, as black people had been using the term, became clear to white people when Saturday Night Live played a Jeopardy! sketch with Chadwick Boseman as his Black Panther character T'Challa. The Guardian notes that "the image of a white woman calling police on black people put the lie to the myth of racial innocence". Contemporary Karens have been compared to Carolyn Bryant (a white woman whom Emmett Till was accused of offending, resulting in his lynching), and in literature, Mayella Ewell (a fictional character in the 1960 novel To Kill a Mockingbird).

"It was through that performance that Amy Cooper took on the mantle of an American archetype: the white woman who weaponizes her vulnerability to exact violence upon a Black man. In history, she is Carolyn Bryant, the adult white woman whose complaint about a 14-year-old Emmett Till led to his torture and murder at the hands of racist white adults. In literature, she is Scarlett O’Hara sending her husband out to join a KKK lynching party or Mayella Ewell testifying under oath that a Black man who had helped her had raped her. In 2020, she is simply Karen."

— Julia Carrie Wong in The Guardian.

The meme became most popular in 2020 when the Black Lives Matter movement surged in response to multiple events. André Brock, a Georgia Tech professor of black digital culture, connected the virality of the meme in the summer of 2020 with the coronavirus pandemic, the murder of George Floyd, and the Central Park birdwatching incident, noting that both incidents had occurred the same weekend during a period when much of the world had been forced to stay home and had plenty of free time to watch the videos. He said that the virality of the two videos was the result of an "interest convergence" in which the pandemic "intersected with collective outrage over police brutality" and "highlighted the extreme violence—and potentially fatal consequences—of a white woman selfishly calling the cops out of spite and professed fear". Apryl Williams of the University of Michigan called it a "Black activist meme", saying that it was ultimately beneficial in helping people recognize problematic behaviors, but warning that jokes downplayed the threat posed to black people. Williams, who has traced Karen's historical lineage, writes, "In the past, Black bodies were controlled in public spaces by threats of violence, lynching, and routine, targeted racialized terror that dictated who Black people could speak to, where they were allowed to live, and in which spaces they were able to exist. Presently, the routine act of calling the police on Black people in public spaces extends this historical practice of regulating Black bodies to maintain White supremacist order."

Multiple writers have rejected accusations of the term being equivalent to "the N-word for white women", and when a Twitter user ran a poll asking if the word should be banned on that platform, over 96% voted "no". Karen Attiah, Global Opinions editor for The Washington Post, claims that it lacks the historical context to be a slur and that calling it one trivializes actual discrimination.

=== Male context ===
The term is generally used to refer to women, but The Atlantic noted that "a man can easily be called a Karen", with staff writer David A. Graham calling then-president Donald Trump the "Karen in chief". It's considered negative because it reflects a disregard for others' perspectives, a tendency to escalate minor issues, and an entitlement to special treatment, all of which can lead to conflict and harm in social interactions. Similarly, in November 2020, a tweet calling Elon Musk "Space Karen" over comments he made regarding the effectiveness of COVID-19 testing became viral. Numerous names for a male equivalent of Karen have been floated, with little agreement on a single name. Ken and Kevin are commonly used names. The Jim Crow-era male equivalent to Miss Ann was Mister Charlie.

== Criticism ==
The term has been called racist, sexist, ageist, classist, and misogynist by some. Hadley Freeman, columnist and features writer for The Guardian, argues that use of the meme has become less about describing behavior than controlling it and "telling women to shut up". Jennifer Weiner, writing in The New York Times during the COVID-19 pandemic, said the meme had succeeded in silencing her, saying she had had to balance her desire to complain about a nearby man coughing into the open air, hawking and spitting on the sidewalk, with her fear of being called a Karen.

In August 2020, Helen Lewis wrote in The Atlantic, "Karen has become synonymous with woman among those who consider woman an insult. There is now a market, measured in attention and approbation, for anyone who can sniff out a Karen." Lewis also noted what she called the "finger trap" of the term, saying "What is more Karen than complaining about being called 'Karen'? There is a strong incentive to be cool about other women being Karened, lest you be Karened yourself."

British journalist and feminist Julie Bindel asked, "Does anyone else think the 'Karen' slur is woman-hating and based on class prejudice?" Freeman replied, saying it was "sexist, ageist, and classist, in that order". Kaitlyn Tiffany, writing in The Atlantic, asked, "Is a Karen just a woman who does anything at all that annoys people? If so, what is the male equivalent?", saying the meme was being called misogynistic. Nina Burleigh wrote that the memes "are merely excuses to heap scorn on random middle-aged white women". Matt Schimkowitz, a senior editor at Know Your Meme, stated to Business Insider in 2019 that the term "just kind of took over all forms of criticism towards white women online."

The term is characterized as a pejorative or controlling term for women's behavior. The term has been criticized as preventing women from speaking up for themselves. Writer Ahmed Pierstorff says, "The Karen archetype is just the most recent, millennial-sanctioned attempt to keep women in their place."

The term has been criticized as fueling misogynistic stereotypes, such as when it is paired with calling women "shrill" or "loud mouthed." Use of the term has been criticized as biased where women are judged more harshly than men for the same behaviors.

Women named Karen have been bullied and felt they could not share opinions without being labelled and silenced. One recent study found that the perceived disrespect and abuse they experience because of their name has had a negative impact on the mental health of women who are named Karen. Some 23 percent of the study participants reported that they had been verbally threatened and seven percent reported that they had been physically assaulted after others heard their name. Such discriminatory treatment is similar to the "namism" experienced by others who bear given names that have been used as slurs for racial or cultural groups. Participants in the study came from a variety of religious, racial, cultural and economic backgrounds, reflecting the widespread popularity of the name Karen for women in the Anglosphere during the mid-20th century.

Writer, speaker, and activist Sarah Haider calls it a "term of abuse" and explains it is used in place of calling women slurs and to get away with socially acceptable misogyny.

In a UK employment case in June 2025, the employment judge said that the term "Karen" was pejorative and borderline racist, sexist, and ageist.

== Notable examples ==
In 2018, a former New York and New Jersey Port Authority police commissioner, Caren Turner, was filmed berating two Tenafly, New Jersey, police officers for pulling over a car in which her daughter was riding. The video emerged in 2021.

During the COVID-19 pandemic, the term was used to describe women abusing Asian-American health workers due to the virus's origins in Mainland China, those hoarding essential supplies such as toilet paper, and both those who policed others' behavior to enforce quarantine and those who protested the continuance of the restrictions because they prevented them visiting hair salons and other businesses, as well as over being forced to wear face masks inside stores, prompting one critic to ask whether the term had devolved into an all-purpose term of disapproval or criticism for middle-aged white women. Use of the term increased from 100,000 mentions on social media in January 2020 to 2.7 million in May 2020.

In May 2020, Christian Cooper wrote about encountering a woman in Central Park whose "inner Karen fully emerged and took a dark turn" in response to him recording their disagreement over the requirement for her dog to be leashed in the area. He recorded her calling the police and telling them that an "African-American man" was threatening her and her dog.

In December 2020, Miya Ponsetto was dubbed "SoHo Karen" after tackling 14-year-old Keyon Harrold Jr., son of jazz trumpeter Keyon Harrold, in the lobby of the Arlo Hotel in New York City and accusing him of stealing her phone. Ponsetto alleged that she was assaulted during the altercation, though she could not provide evidence to her claim. An Uber driver returned her phone after the incident. In early January 2021, Ponsetto was arrested in Ventura County, California, and extradited to New York, where she was charged with grand larceny, attempted robbery, child endangerment, and two counts of assault, as she also attacked Harrold Sr. during the altercation. It was also revealed that Ponsetto was arrested twice in 2020 for public intoxication and drunk driving. During the initial court hearing in March 2021, Ponsetto interrupted the judge by requesting to avoid jail time.

In September 2025, while attending a baseball game between the Miami Marlins and Philadelphia Phillies, a fan retrieved a home run ball to give to his son. The fan was confronted by a woman, and he gave her the ball to avoid confrontation. Having been televised, several women were incorrectly identified as the "Phillies Karen" by the Internet and subjected to harassment.

=== Legislation ===
In July 2020, San Francisco Board of Supervisors member Shamann Walton introduced the Caution Against Racially Exploitative Non-Emergencies (CAREN) Act, which proposed changing the San Francisco Police Code to prohibit the fabrication of racially biased emergency reports. The Act was passed unanimously in October of that year, after which Williams noted "these memes are actually doing logical and political work of helping us get to legal changes".

== Other uses ==
The mid-2019 formation of Tropical Storm Karen in the Atlantic hurricane basin led to memes likening the storm to the stereotype; several users made jokes about the storm wanting to "speak with the manager", with images photoshopped to include the "Karen haircut" on either the hurricane or its forecast path.

In July 2020, Domino's Pizza ran an advertisement in Australia and New Zealand offering free pizzas to "nice Karens"; the company later apologized and dropped the ad amidst criticism.

In July 2020, an Internet meme in the form of a parody advertisement for a fictional American Girl "Girl of the Year" character depicted as a personification of the "Karen" stereotype, wearing a track suit, bob haircut and openly carrying a semi-automatic pistol while defiantly violating face mask guidelines mandated due to the COVID-19 pandemic, provoked criticism from the doll line, who took umbrage at the use of their name and trade dress, stating that they were "disgusted" by a post from brand strategist Adam Padilla under the online persona "Adam the Creator", and "are working with the appropriate teams at American Girl to ensure this copyright violation is handled appropriately." Boing Boing, however, expressed doubts over the merits of American Girl's proposed legal action against the "Karen" parodies citing the Streisand effect, though it has also noted the debate on whether the satirical intent of the parody advertisement is protected by law.

In July 2020, the BBC called the Wall of Moms "a good example of mainly middle-class, middle-aged white women explicitly not being Karens. Instead, the Wall of Moms is seen by activists as using their privilege to protest against the very same systemic racism and classism that Karens actively seek to exploit."

Karens for Hire began in early 2022, charging a fee to help people with complaints against companies.

== Related terms ==
The Filipino slang term Marites bears a similar meaning and connotation to Karen, although the term is more often used in a humorous or light-hearted way, especially in reference to the stereotypical gossip-monger in Filipino neighborhoods.

In Poland, the slang term madka (distorted spelling of the word "matka" – mother) has a similar meaning. Madka is a young, burdensome woman raising children, having a demanding attitude towards others, considering herself better because she gave birth to a child. She believes that for this reason alone she deserves special consideration, she should receive everything for free and her children can do whatever they want because "they are just kids".

In Serbia, the given name Slavica (Serbian Cyrillic: Славица) has the similar meaning. As Ivana Stojanov of Nova.rs wrote: "Slavica is our copy of Karen, mostly a middle-aged woman who dramatizes, likes to attack people in her free time, mostly cashiers. She is frustrated, dissatisfied, anti-vaxxer, she does not believe in wearing masks and corona in the age of a pandemic, she believes that Bill Gates and [George] Soros are controlling us all from the shadows, and that they will surely microchip us. She probably knows when you left the apartment and came home, she'll stop you on the stairs to ask why you didn't have a baby when it was due, but she'll also give you a lesson about how you'd be better off walking a child instead of a puppy."

== See also ==
- Angry Black Woman
- Angry White Male
- Karen (film)
- Becky (slang)
- Bye, Felicia
- Bye Felipe
- Chad (slang)
- Cracker (term)
- Gammon (insult)
- Karen Eliot
- OK boomer
- Trixie (slang)
- Prima donna
- Miss Ann
- Stereotypes of white Americans
