= Abdullah Mohamed al-Dawood =

Saudi Arabian cleric

Abdullah Mohamed al-Dawood (Arabic: عبدالله محمد الداود) is a Saudi author, known for self-help books and conservative views.

In May 2013, his Twitter comment calling for the harassment of women working as cashiers in order to pressure them to stay as housewives generated negative international publicity. al-Dawood argued that his comment was mistranslated and misquoted.
