= Valley girl =

American stereotype and stock character

A valley girl is the stereotype of a materialistic upper-middle-class young woman, associated with unique vocabulary, vocal mannerisms, and California accent features, who comes from the Los Angeles commuter communities of the San Fernando Valley. A youth subcultural identity and stock character in American popular media, it originated in and is most associated with the 1980s and 1990s. In subsequent years, the term became more broadly applied to any young American woman who epitomized frivolity, ditziness, airheadedness, or who prioritizes superficial concerns such as personal appearance, physical attractiveness, and conspicuous consumption over intellectual or more meaningful accomplishments.

== Valleyspeak ==
Valleyspeak, or valspeak, is a (stereotypical) California English social dialect and accompanying vocal features, best associated with Valley girls, though elements of it may be used by other demographics, including some men of a similar background ("val dudes"). This sociolect became an international fad for a certain period in the 1980s and 1990s. Valleyspeak is popularly characterized by both the steady use of uptalk, certain vowel sounds, and its vocabulary. The vowel sounds are in fact part of the larger California vowel shift becoming more common in the American West and Canada, as well as elsewhere in the U.S. Certain features once associated with Valspeak are now simply mainstream in many American speakers born since the late 20th century.

=== Language ideology ===
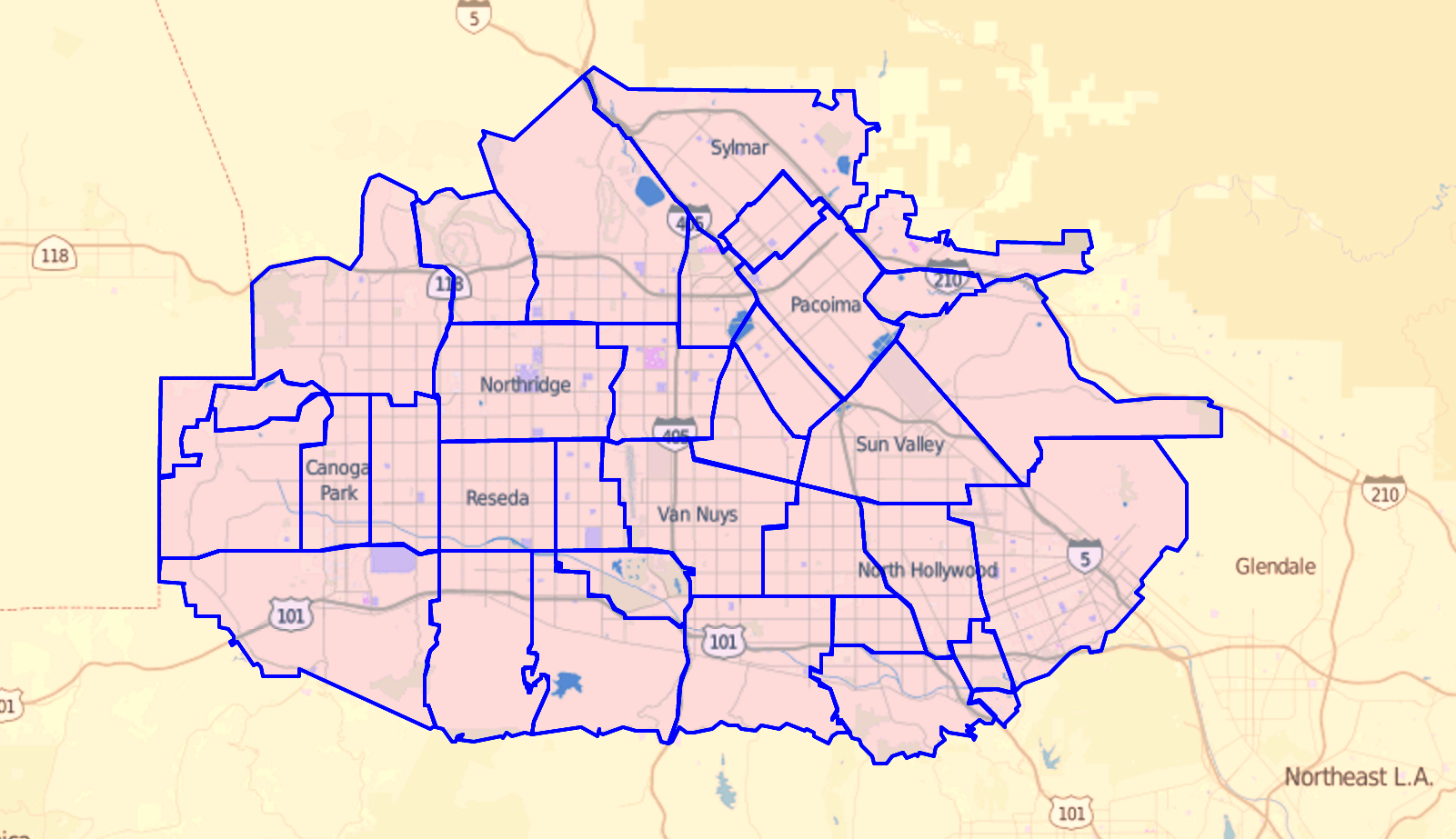
Map of neighborhoods of the San Fernando Valley

This lends itself to explicit language ideologies about dialects in the area as they receive more scrutiny than dialects in other nearby regions. Linguistic characteristics of valleyspeak are often thought to be "silly" and "superficial" and seen as a sign of low intelligence. Speakers are also often perceived as "materialistic" and "air-headed". The use of "like" or the quotative phrase "be like" are often ideologically linked to California and Valleyspeak despite the now-widespread use of the terms among youth, which results in their also receiving the "superficial" cast. In the national understanding, California speech is thought to be a product of the combination of Valley girl and surfer dude speech, and "is associated with good English, but never proper".

A study on regional language ideologies done in California in 2007 found that, despite its prevalence and association with California in past decades, Californians themselves do not consider "Valley girls" to be an overly prevalent social or linguistic group within the state. State residents listed factors such as immigrant populations and north–south regional slang as more relevant than Valleyspeak within the state.

Amanda Ritchart, a doctoral candidate studying linguistics at the University of California, San Diego, analyzed 23-year-olds (college age students) from diverse socioeconomic backgrounds and ethnicities, specifically in the Southern California region. After this study, Ritchart once stated, "Women used uptalk more frequently than men did. Their pitch rose higher overall, and the rise began much later in the phrase." Even though the gender difference is notable, the majority of both men and women speak in uptalk in Southern California. In fact, 100% of the participants used uptalk when they asked a confirming question, such as "Go all the way to the right in the middle where it says Canyon Hills?"

According to the article "What's Up With Upspeak?", when women use Valleyspeak, it is assumed that they have "inferior speech" patterns. For men, the high rise of intonation usually "plateaued" at certain points, especially in situations where they didn't want to be interrupted.

=== Features and qualifiers ===
The sound of Valleyspeak has these main habits: nasal sound; breathiness; uptalk, or the sound of a question; and vocal fry.

- High rising terminal (also called "up speak" or "uptalk") is a defining feature of Valleyspeak. Statements have a rising intonation, causing declarative language to appear interrogative to listeners unfamiliar with the dialect. Research on uptalk has found a number of pragmatic uses, including confirming that the interlocutor follows what is being said and indicating that the speaker has more to say and so their conversation partner should not interrupt them (also called "floor holding"). Another use is as a confirmation statement of general agreement, such as "I know, right?" or simply "right?" The difference between the intonation of a question, confirmation statements, and floor holding is determined by the extent of the rise and its location within the phrase. The high rising terminal feature has spread and been adopted outside the geographical area and groups originally associated with Valleyspeak including, in some cases, men. (However, in some varieties of English, usage of high rising terminal emerged independently and/or has been documented as preceding Valleyspeak by decades, such as in Australian English and New Zealand English.)
- "Like" as a discourse marker. "Like" is used as a filler word, similar to "um" or "er", as in, "I'm, like, totally about to blow chunks." When "like" is functioning as a discourse marker, the word itself does not semantically change the phrase or sentence. Instead, it provides time for the speaker to formulate what they will say next. The word is always unstressed when used in this way. "Like" does not always function as a discourse marker in Valspeak. Consider the following two sentences: "It was like eight feet deep," and "I think that, like, it is entertaining." Even though both sentences contain the word "like," they employ it differently. In the former, "like" serves as an adverb that is synonymous with "approximately", whereas the latter "like" is a discourse marker, adding no additional meaning to the sentence. Furthermore, "like" is frequently used to introduce quoted speech. For example, a person can recount a conversation by stating, "So, uh, I'm like, 'Where did he go?' And she was like, 'I don't know, I haven't seen him.'"
- "To be like" as a colloquial quotative. "Like" (always unstressed) is used to indicate that what follows is not necessarily an exact quotation of what was said, but captures the meaning and intention of the quoted speech. As an example, in "And I was like, 'Don't ever speak to my boyfriend again,'" the speaker is indicating that they may or may not have literally said those words, but they conveyed that idea. "To be like" can introduce both a monologue or direct speech, allowing a speaker to express an attitude, reaction, or thought, or to use the phrase to signal quotation.
- Particular slang terms, including "to be all" or "to be all like" used in the same manner as "to be like"; "whatever" or "as if" used to express any disbelief; "totally" meaning "quite" or "very"; "seriously" as a frequent interjection of approval or an inquiry of veracity; "bitchin'" meaning "excellent"; and "grody" meaning "dirty".
- Vocal fry is characterized by "low, creaky vibrations" or a "guttural vibration". Researchers have studied two qualities of this speech pattern, such as the jitter (variation in pitch) and shimmer (variation in volume). When women tend to speak with these mannerisms, they are perceived as less competent, less hirable, less trustworthy, or less educated. A prominent example is Kim Kardashian.

== In popular culture ==
- Laraine Newman is often credited with the introduction of the "Valley Girl Accent" after her portrayal of her original character Sherry on Saturday Night Live starting in 1975.
- The 1982 hit single "Valley Girl" by Frank Zappa, on which his 14-year-old daughter Moon delivered a monologue in "Valleyspeak" behind the music, brought wider attention to Valspeak and the term "valley girl". This song popularized phrases such as "grody to the max" and "gag me with a spoon" as well as the use of the term "like", which did not originate in Valleyspeak, as a discourse marker. Zappa intended to lampoon the image, but after the song's release there was a significant increase in the "Valspeak" slang usage, whether ironically spoken or not. Zappa herself portrayed a valley girl in the episode "Speedway Fever", the fifth episode of the sixth season of the TV series CHiPs.
- The character of Jennifer DiNuccio, played by Tracy Nelson in the 1982–1983 sitcom Square Pegs, was an early example of the Valley Girl stereotype. According to an interview with Nelson included on the 2008 DVD release of the series, she developed the character's Valleyspeak and personality prior to the Zappa recording's popularity.
- The 1983 film Valley Girl starring Nicolas Cage and Deborah Foreman centered on a group of "Valley Girl" characters and featured several characterizations associated with their lifestyle (such as going shopping at the mall or "Galleria", suntanning at the beach, and going to parties).
- In the animated TV series Tiny Toon Adventures, Shirley the Loon, an anthropomorphic waterfowl, speaks with a thick Valley girl accent and is quite smart but also obsessed with New Age paraphernalia and also seems to have some magic abilities. She appears not to notice the other meaning of her surname as she often recites "oh, what a loon i am" while meditating.
- Cher Horowitz, the protagonist of the 1995 film Clueless, played by Alicia Silverstone, has been described as a caricature of 1990s Valley girls, though she is actually from nearby Beverly Hills and even before making awkward but sincere efforts to live a more purposeful life, was somewhat altruistic.
- On the 1990s television series Hercules: The Legendary Journeys and Xena: Warrior Princess the character of Aphrodite, the goddess of love, played by Alexandra Tydings, speaks with a heavy Valley girl accent, despite the anachronism of the series taking place in Ancient Greece. She also has an obsession with material possessions and her own physical attractiveness.
- In the recurring Saturday Night Live sketch "The Californians", the characters speak with wildly exaggerated valley accents.
- American Girl doll Courtney Moore, a historical character from 1986, has an older stepsister named Tina D'Amico, who is often referred to as a Valley girl by doll collectors, despite Tina herself not yet becoming an official doll. Tina and Courtney live in Orange Valley, a fictional version of Los Angeles.
- In her 2015 memoir entitled Wildflower, actress Drew Barrymore says she talks "like a Valley girl" because she lived in Sherman Oaks from the age of 7 to 14.
- The "influencer speak" or "TikTok voice" accent prominent on digital platforms such as TikTok is believed to derive from the Valley girl accent.
- A 2004 comedy White Chicks centers heavily on parodying the "Valley girl" archetype.
- in the animated webseries Battle for Dream Island, Match speaks like a typical Valley girl, often using the word "like" and "OMG".

== See also ==
- Bimbo
- Blonde stereotype
- Essex girl
- Filler
- Julie Brown, among the performers from the era who personified and popularized the valley girl image
- Gap Girls and The Californians, Saturday Night Live sketches based on valley people
- VSCO girl
- Like (discourse particle)
- Clueless, a 1995 film that prominently features valleyspeak
- Preppy
- Basic (slang)
- Sexy baby voice
- Surf culture
- Vocal fry register
