= Miss Ann =

African-American slang

Miss Ann is an expression used inside the African-American community to refer to a white woman (or sometimes a black woman) who is arrogant and condescending in her attitude.

The characteristics associated with someone called a "Miss Ann" include being considered "uppity", or in the case of a black woman, "acting white".

Like the male counterpart term Mister Charlie, the term Miss Ann was once common among many African Americans. It was a pejorative way of commenting on imperious actions and attitudes from white women, particularly when such behavior came with racist undertones. It is seldom used by young African Americans today; instead, the similar term Karen has become popular among Americans of all races.

== In popular culture ==
Miss Anne: “A White Woman”
—Zora Neale Hurston, Glossary of Harlem Slang

Ann; Miss Ann: Coded term for any white female. [i.e.] “His mama washes clothes on Wednesday for Miss Ann.”
—Clarence Major, From Juba to Jive: A Dictionary of African-American Slang

Ann: (1) A derisive term for a white woman ... Also “Miss Ann.”
—Geneva Smitherman, Black Talk

Miss Ann and Mister Eddie: Emancipated bluebloods.
—Emmanuel Taylor Gordon, Born to Be

"I’d remind them please, look at those knees, you got at Miss Ann’s scrubbing."
–Maya Angelou, Sepia Fashion Show

"Oh, oh, oh, Miss Ann, you're doing something no one can…"
–"Miss Ann" song by Little Richard. Here the singer may be referring to the white woman, Ann Johnson, who mothered him as a young teenager, twisting the standard connotation in ambiguous ways.

"Miss Ann", a jazz composition written by Eric Dolphy and recorded several times by him; originally released on his LP record Far Cry (1962). The composition is semantically unrelated to the subject of this article, rather it is "a sketch of a girl he [Dolphy] knows." However, this is not obvious to someone who hears the music and its title without that context.

== See also ==
- House Negro
- Mister Charlie
- Uncle Tom
- Karen (slang)
