= Marites (slang) =

Filipino slang term

Marites (also spelled Maritess) is a Filipino slang term for a person who likes to gossip. It is often used for nosy neighbors or people who spread rumors, both offline and online. The term is believed to come from the phrase "Mare, ano ang latest?" ("Sis, what's the latest?"). Marites is also a common female nickname in the Philippines, which helped the term become widely known.

== History ==
Gossip has always been part of life in the Philippines and is known as chismis, a word that comes from Spanish. It traditionally spread through barangays, homes, and community spaces, serving to share news and maintain social connections.

The term "Marites" became popular in the early 2020s, during the COVID-19 pandemic, when people spent more time online. Gossip spread fast on sites like Facebook, TikTok, and X, and the phrase "Manahimik ka, Marites" ("Be quiet, Marites) was used to tell someone to stop meddling or spreading rumors.

== Characteristics ==
A Marites is someone who pays close attention to what is happening around them, especially other people's business. They are usually chatty, curious, and quick to share news, whether in the neighborhood or online. People also use the term in a playful way—for example, a casual gossip meet-up with friends might be called a "marites session".

Gossip has always been part of life in the Philippines and is a way for people to stay connected. The idea that gossip is only "a woman's habit" comes from the tendency to judge women more harshly.

The term Marites is sometimes used to single out women, LGBTQ people, and other groups, which can lead to harassment and criticism online.

== Comparison with similar terms ==
Marites is sometimes compared to the American slang or pejorative term Karen, but the two are not the same. A Karen usually describes someone seen as entitled or confrontational, while a Marites is someone who spreads gossip and rumors. Both names highlight behaviors that can be socially annoying, but they come from very different cultural situations.

== See also ==
- Gossip
- Karen (slang)
