= Becky (slang) =

Pejorative American slang term

In some areas of American popular culture, the name Becky is a pejorative slang term for a young white woman. The term has come to be associated with a "white girl who loves Starbucks and Uggs"; for this reason, "Becky" is often associated with the slang term "basic", which has many similar connotations.

In 2019, dictionary publisher Merriam-Webster wrote that "Becky" was "increasingly functioning as an epithet, and being used especially to refer to a white woman who is ignorant of both her privilege and her prejudice." The term "Karen" has a similar connotation but is associated with older women.

== Origins ==
In USA Today in 2016, Cara Kelly suggested that the term dates to the social climber Becky Sharp, protagonist of William Makepeace Thackeray's novel Vanity Fair (1848) and the 2004 film of the same name. In Mark Twain's novel The Adventures of Tom Sawyer (1876), Tom Sawyer falls in love with Becky Thatcher, with her "yellow hair plaited into two long tails." "Becky" is the title and subject of the fourth segment of Jean Toomer's Harlem Renaissance novel Cane (1923), about a white woman with two black sons. Daphne du Maurier's novel Rebecca (1938) features another woman "who will always be in a man's head", Kelly wrote.

== Meaning and use ==
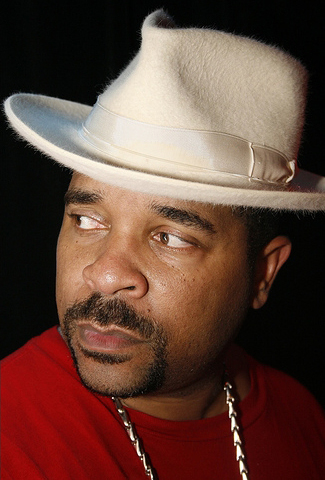
Sir Mix-a-Lot's song "Baby Got Back" (1992) was the source of the "ur-Becky".

According to Damon Young in The Root, the term denotes "a certain type of privileged young White woman who exists in a state of racial obliviousness that shifts from intentionally clueless to intentionally condescending". The modern term, the "ur-Becky", is thought to date to Sir Mix-a-Lot's song "Baby Got Back" (1992), in which one woman says to another: "Oh my God, Becky, look at her butt".

In the song "Becky" (2009), the American rapper Plies used the term to refer to fellatio.

Beyoncé's song "Sorry" (2016), from her album Lemonade, brought the term to wider attention. "He only want me when I'm not there / He better call Becky with the good hair" appeared to refer to a white woman with whom the narrator's partner had had an affair. "Good hair" refers within black communities to long, straight hair. Karsonya Wise Whitehead, professor of African-American studies, offered two interpretations of Becky: a woman the speaker does not respect, and a clueless white woman "who is kind of racist, [and] who makes statements without knowing what she's saying". Whitehead did not see the term as a racial slur, pointing out that the "good hair" part of the lyric was the more racially significant piece, referring to the idea that straight hair is preferable to Afro-textured hair. The meaning settled on a young white woman, unaware of her racial and social privilege, who loves Starbucks and Uggs, and who might take photographs of her Frappuccino.

In 2017, Rebecca Tuvel, the author at the center of the Hypatia transracialism controversy, was labelled a Becky by critics. The following year, a white woman in California became known as "BBQ Becky" after calling the police because two African-American men were using a charcoal grill in a park. In 2020, an edited volume, Surviving Becky(s): Pedagogies for Deconstructing Whiteness and Gender, examined what its editor, education professor Cheryl E. Matias, called the "increasing phenomenon of Beckyism: the behaviors and rhetoric that Becky(s) engage in which uphold whiteness at the expense of people of color's humanity, dignity, and expertise". Media-studies professor Aimée Morrison argues that white supremacy makes whiteness invisible and that use of the term Becky thwarts this.

It has a different meaning in the incel community. They refer to attractive, sexually active women as "Stacys", and less attractive sexually active women as "Beckys".

The term Karen serves a similar function to Becky, with the added implication that a Karen is likely to engage in aggressive actions against people of color, such as asking to see a manager or calling the police. As media researcher Meredith Clark put it: "Karen has gone by different names."

== See also ==
- Bye, Felicia
- Chad (slang)
- Trixie (slang)
