= Like =

English language word

In English, the word like has a very wide range of uses, both conventional and non-standard. It can be used as a noun, verb, adverb, adjective, preposition, particle, conjunction, hedge, filler, quotative, and semi-suffix.

== Uses ==
=== Comparisons ===
Like is one of the words in the English language that can introduce a simile (a stylistic device comparing two dissimilar ideas). It can be used as a preposition, as in "He runs like a cheetah"; it can also be used as a suffix, as in "She acts very child-like". It can also be used in non-simile comparisons such as, "She has a dog like ours".

=== As a conjunction ===
Like is often used in place of the subordinating conjunction as, or as if. Examples:

- They look like they have been having fun.
- They look as if they have been having fun.

Many people became aware of the two options in 1954, when a famous ad campaign for Winston cigarettes introduced the slogan "Winston tastes good—like a cigarette should." The slogan was criticized for its usage by prescriptivists, the "as" construction being considered more proper. Winston countered with another ad, featuring a woman with greying hair in a bun who insists that ought to be "Winston tastes good as a cigarette should" and is shouted down by happy cigarette smokers asking "What do you want—good grammar or good taste?"

The appropriateness of its usage as a conjunction is still disputed, however. In some circles, it is considered an error to use like instead of as or as if in formal prose.

=== As a noun ===
Like can be used as a noun meaning "preference" or "kind". Examples:

- She had many likes and dislikes.
- We'll never see the like again.

When used specifically on social media, it can refer to interactions with content posted by a user, commonly referred to as "likes" on websites such as Twitter or Instagram.

- That picture you posted got a lot of likes!

=== As a verb ===
As a verb, like generally refers to a fondness for something or someone.

- I like riding my bicycle.

Like can be used to express a feeling of attraction between two people that is weaker than love. It does not necessarily imply a romantic attraction. Example:

- Marc likes Denise.
- I've taken a liking to our new neighbors.

Like can also be used to indicate a wish for something in a polite manner. Example:

- Would you like a cup of coffee?

=== As a colloquial adverb ===
In some regional dialects of English, like may be used as an adverbial colloquialism in the construction be + like + to infinitive, meaning "be likely to, be ready to, be on the verge of." Examples:

- He was like to go back next time.
- He was like to go mad.

As the following attest, this construction has a long history in the English language.

- But Clarence had slumped to his knees before I had half-finished, and he was like to go out of his mind with fright. (Mark Twain, 1889, A Connecticut Yankee in King Arthur’s Court)
- He saw he was like to leave such an heir. (Cotton Mather, 1853, Magnalia Christi Americana)
- He was like to lose his life in the one [battle] and his liberty in the other [capture], but there was none of his money at stake in either. (Charles MacFarlane and Thomas Napier Thomson, 1792, Comprehensive History of England)
- He was in some fear that if he could not bring about the King's desires, he was like to lose his favor. (Gilbert Burnet, 1679, History of the Reformation of the Church of England)

=== As a colloquial quotative ===
Like is sometimes used colloquially as a quotative to introduce a quotation or impersonation. This is also known as "quotation through simile". The word is often used to express that what follows is not an exact quotation but instead gives a general feel for what was said. In this usage, like functions in conjunction with a verb, generally be (but also say, think, etc.), as in the following examples:

- He was like, "I'll be there in five minutes."
- She was like, "You need to leave the room right now!"

Like can also be used to paraphrase an implicitly unspoken idea or sentiment:

- I was like, "Who do they think they are?"

The marking of past tense is often omitted (compare historical present):

- They told me all sorts of terrible things, and I'm like "Forget it then."

It is also sometimes used to introduce non-verbal mimetic performances, e.g., facial expressions, hand gestures, body movement, as well as sounds and noises:

- I was like [speaker rolls eyes].
- The car was like, "vroom!"

The use of like as a quotative is known to have been around since at least the 1980s.

=== As a discourse particle ===
Like can be used in much the same way as "um..." or "er..." as a discourse particle. It has become common especially among North American teenagers to use the word "like" in this way, as in Valspeak. For example:

- I, like, don't know what to do.

It is also becoming more often used (East Coast Scottish English, Northern England English, Hiberno-English and Welsh English in particular) at the end of a sentence, as an alternative to you know. This usage is sometimes considered to be a colloquial interjection and it implies a desire to remain calm and defuse tension:

- I didn't say anything, like.
- Just be cool, like.

It is traditionally, though not quite every time, used to finish a sentence in the Northern English dialect Geordie.

Use of like as a filler has a long history in Scots English, as in Robert Louis Stevenson's 1886 novel Kidnapped:

"What'll like be your business, mannie?"
"What's like wrong with him?" said she at last.

=== As a hedge ===
Like can be used as hedge to indicate that the following phrase will be an approximation or exaggeration, or that the following words may not be quite right, but are close enough. It may indicate that the phrase in which it appears is to be taken metaphorically or as a hyperbole. This use of like is sometimes regarded as adverbial, as like is often synonymous here with adverbial phrases of approximation, such as "almost" or "more or less". Examples:

- I have like no money left.
- The restaurant is only like five miles from here.
- I like almost died!

Conversely, like may also be used to indicate a counterexpectation to the speaker, or to indicate certainty regarding the following phrase. Examples:

- There was like a living kitten in the box!
- This is like the only way to solve the problem.
- I like know what I'm doing, okay?

Very early use of this locution can be seen in a New Yorker cartoon of 15 September 1928, in which two young ladies are discussing a man's workplace: "What's he got – an awfice?" "No, he's got like a loft." It is also used in the 1962 novel A Clockwork Orange by the narrator as part of his teenage slang and in the Top Cat cartoon series from 1961 to 1962 by the jazz beatnik type characters.

== History ==
Especially since the late 20th century onward, like has appeared, in addition to its traditional uses, as a colloquialism across all dialects of spoken English, serving as a discourse particle, signalling either a hedge indicating uncertainty, or alternatively a marker of focus signalling that what follows is new information Although these particular colloquial uses of like became widespread among young students in the 1980s, its use as a filler is a fairly old regional practice in Welsh English and in Scotland; it was used similarly at least as early as the 19th century. It may also be used in a systemic format to allow individuals to introduce what they say, how they say and think.

Despite such prevalence in modern-day spoken English, colloquial usages of like rarely appear in writing (unless the writer is deliberately trying to replicate colloquial dialogue) and they have long been stigmatized in formal speech or in high cultural or high social settings. Furthermore, this use of like seems to appear most commonly, in particular, among people who were children and adolescents in the 1980s, while less so, or not at all, among people who were already middle-aged or elderly at that time. One suggested explanation was that younger English speakers were still developing their linguistic competence, and, metalinguistically wishing to express ideas without sounding too confident, certain, or assertive, use like to fulfill this purpose in the cases where they were using like as a hedge.

In pop culture, colloquial applications of like (especially in verbal excess) are commonly and often comedically associated with Valley girls, as made famous through the song "Valley Girl" by Frank Zappa, released in 1982, and the film of the same name, released in the following year. Even though this use of like predates it, the stereotyped "valley girl" language is an exaggeration of the variants of California English spoken by people who were young in the 1980s.

This non-traditional usage of the word has been around at least since the 1950s, introduced through beat (or beatnik) and jazz culture. The beatnik character Maynard G. Krebs (Bob Denver) in the popular Dobie Gillis TV series of 1959-1963 brought the expression to prominence; this was reinforced in later decades by the character of Shaggy on Scooby-Doo (who was based on Krebs).

In the UK reality television series Love Island the word 'like' has been used an average of 300 times per episode, much to the annoyance of viewers.

A common eye dialect spelling is lyk.

== See also ==
- Like button

== Bibliography ==
- Andersen, Gisle. (1998). The pragmatic marker like from a relevance-theoretic perspective. In A. H. Jucker & Y. Ziv (Eds.) Discourse markers: Descriptions and Theory (pp. 147–70). Amsterdam: John Benjamins.
- Andersen, Gisle. (2000). The role of the pragmatic marker like in utterance interpretation. In G. Andersen & T. Fretheim (Ed.), Pragmatic markers and propositional attitude: Pragmatics and beyond (pp. 79). Amsterdam: John Benjamins.
- Barbieri, Federica. (2005). Quotative use in American English. A corpus-based, cross-register comparison. Journal of English Linguistics, 33, (3), 225–256.
- Barbieri, Federica. (2007). 'Older men and younger women': A corpus-based study of quotative use in American English. English World-Wide, 28, (1), 23–45.
- Blyth, Carl Jr.; Recktenwald, Sigrid; & Wang, Jenny. (1990). I'm like, 'Say what?!': A new quotative in American oral narrative. American Speech, 65, 215–227.
- Cruse, A. (2000). Meaning in language. An introduction to semantics and pragmatics.
- Cukor-Avila, Patricia; (2002). She says, she goes, she is like: Verbs of quotation over time in African American Vernacular English. American Speech, 77 (1), 3-31.
- Dailey-O'Cain, Jennifer. (2000). The sociolinguistic distribution of and attitudes toward focuser like and quotative like. Journal of Sociolinguistics, 4, 60–80.
- D'Arcy, Alexandra. (2017). Discourse-pragmatic variation in context: Eight hundred years of LIKE. Amsterdam: John Benjamins.
- Ferrara, Kathleen; & Bell, Barbara. (1995). Sociolinguistic variation and discourse function of constructed dialogue introducers: The case of be+like. American Speech, 70, 265–289.
- Fleischman, Suzanne. (1998). Des jumeaux du discours. La Linguistique, 34 (2), 31–47.
- Golato, Andrea; (2000). An innovative German quotative for reporting on embodied actions: Und ich so/und er so 'and I'm like/and he's like'. Journal of Pragmatics, 32, 29–54.
- Jones, Graham M. & Schieffelin, Bambi B. (2009). Enquoting Voices, Accomplishing Talk: Uses of Be+Like in Instant Messaging. Language & Communication, 29(1), 77–113.
- Jucker, Andreas H.; & Smith, Sara W. (1998). And people just you know like 'wow': Discourse markers as negotiating strategies. In A. H. Jucker & Y. Ziv (Eds.), Discourse markers: Descriptions and theory (pp. 171–201). Amsterdam: John Benjamins.
- Mesthrie, R., Swann, J., Deumert, A., & Leap, W. (2009). Introducing sociolinguistics. Edinburgh University Press.
- Miller, Jim; Weinert, Regina. (1995). The function of like in dialogue. Journal of Pragmatics, 23, 365–93.
- Romaine, Suzanne; Lange, Deborah. (1991). The use of like as a marker of reported speech and thought: A case of grammaticalization in progress. American Speech, 66, 227–279.
- Ross, John R.; & Cooper, William E. (1979). Like syntax. In W. E. Cooper & E. C. T. Walker (Eds.), Sentence processing: Psycholinguistic studies presented to Merrill Garrett (pp. 343–418). New York: Erlbaum Associates.
- Schourup, L. (1985). Common discourse particles: "Like", "well", "y'know". New York: Garland.
- Siegel, Muffy E. A. (2002). Like: The discourse particle and semantics. Journal of Semantics, 19 (1), 35–71.
- Taglimonte, Sali; & Hudson, Rachel. (1999). Be like et al. beyond America: The quotative system in British and Canadian youth. Journal of Sociolinguistics, 3 (2), 147–172.
- Tagliamonte, Sali, and Alexandra D'Arcy. (2004). He's like, she's like: The quotative system in Canadian youth. Journal of Sociolinguistics, 8 (4), 493–514.
- Underhill, Robert; (1988). Like is like, focus. American Speech, 63, 234–246.
