= Showbiz Tonight =

American entertainment news program

- Genre: Entertainment news program
- Presented by: A. J. Hammer (2005–2014)
- Country of origin: United States
- Original language: English

Production
- Running time: 42 minutes

Original release
- Network: HLN
- Release: February 20, 2005 – February 6, 2014

Showbiz Tonight is a defunct American entertainment news program that aired from February 20, 2005, until February 6, 2014, on HLN. Showbiz Tonight was hosted by A. J. Hammer at CNN New York at the time of its cancellation. The show reported and debated celebrity entertainment news stories and controversies, along with social networking segments involving viewer interaction via social networks and the program's call-in toll free number. The program aired Monday through Thursday nights at 11 p.m. Eastern, with encore presentations on Tuesday through Saturday mornings at 2 a.m. and 4:10 a.m. Eastern. Showbiz Tonight is also shown several times daily in Europe on Star! Scandinavia, a channel operated by Turner NonStop Television, part of Turner Broadcasting.

On February 3, 2014, HLN canceled Showbiz Tonight, with the final episode airing February 6. Hammer continues to be involved in the network to cover entertainment stories.

== History ==
Hosted by A. J. Hammer in New York City, the program was also hosted by Karyn Bryant when it began airing on February 20, 2005. During the duration of the program, hosting changed with Bryant leaving the show at the end of 2005 and Hammer took on primary hosting duties with correspondents filling in as co-hosts. Brooke Anderson became an official co-host in 2009.

The live telecast moved from 11 p.m. ET to 5 p.m. ET (2 p.m. PT) on March 29, 2010, but moved back to 11 p.m. ET in early May 2011, with the first-run broadcast now airing taped, recorded hours in advance of its initial airtime; meanwhile, the 5 p.m. airing was dropped and replaced with HLN Special Report with Vinnie Politan. A weekday morning replay aired at 11 a.m. ET (8 a.m. PT) from 2009 until April 2011 and a weekend edition, broadcast as either a best-of format or a replay of the Friday show, depending on events, aired on Saturday and Sunday evenings until July 2011.

Showbiz Tonight used a dual-coast format with Hammer based in New York and Anderson in Los Angeles. On April 13, 2011, it was announced that Anderson would leave the program to join the syndicated entertainment program The Insider in May; with Anderson's departure, Showbiz Tonight dropped its Los Angeles–based anchor segments and was recorded solely in New York from that point on. However, story packages that included discussions between the host and celebrity panelists continued to originate from both cities, with segments originating from Los Angeles done via satellite.

== On-air staff ==
=== Former on-air staff ===
- Brooke Anderson – anchor/correspondent (2009–2011, later at The Insider and Entertainment Tonight)
- Karyn Bryant – anchor/correspondent (2005)
- A. J. Hammer – anchor (2005–2014)
- Jane Velez-Mitchell – fill-in anchor (?–?)
- Jill Simonian – (2011)
- Nischelle Turner – correspondent (2011–2014, now co-host of Entertainment Tonight)

== Broadcast ==
Showbiz Tonight is shown several times daily in Europe on Star! Scandinavia, a channel operated by Turner NonStop Television, part of Turner Broadcasting.

== Showbiz Today ==
The program is a revival of Showbiz Today, an earlier program that ran from 1984 until September 10, 2001, on the main CNN network and the international network CNN International. The show's hosts broadcast live from both New York and Los Angeles, and the format was mainly hard entertainment news involving behind the scenes activities and deals, along with movie review segments and premiere summaries rather than the current day format. Previous hosts and reporters on Showbiz Today include:

- Peter Bart
- Andy Culpepper
- Martin Grove
- Gloria Hilliard
- Dana Kennedy
- Lee Leonard
- Dennis Michael
- Jim Moret

- Michael Okwu – From 1997 to 2000, Okwu co-presented Showbiz Today Reports. He was a CNN Entertainment News correspondent while contributing reports as a full-time general assignment correspondent.
- Lisa Schwarzbaum – Schwarzbaum left Entertainment Weekly in 2013.
- Bella Shaw
- Laurin Sydney
- Sherri Sylvester
- Peter Travers
- Bill Tush – Tush was made senior entertainment correspondent for CNN in 1993 and relocated to New York City to host Showbiz Today.
- Liz Wickersham

== See also ==
- Sibila Vargas
- Leo Laporte
