= A. J. Hammer =

American journalist

A.J. Hammer
- Born: October 31, 1966 (age 60); U.S.
- Education: University of Hartford
- Occupations: television and radio personality

A. J. Hammer (born Andrew Goldberg on October 31, 1966) is an American television and radio personality who most recently hosted the HLN channel's former evening entertainment show, Showbiz Tonight.

== Biography ==
From 2001 to 2005, Hammer hosted Court TV's Hollywood Heat, a program focusing on crime and justice in the entertainment business. He also hosted several programs on Sirius Satellite Radio.

Hammer also was a correspondent for several programs including: the daily morning program Good Day New York, the entertainment news program Extra and E! channel's News Live.

During most of the 1990s, he was a host of VH1's Top 10 Countdown.

Hammer is a 1984 graduate of White Plains High School, White Plains, New York. He graduated with a degree in philosophy from the University of Hartford in 1988. He was involved with the Alpha Epsilon Pi fraternity. Hammer began his broadcasting career at the age of 15, at WNBC radio in New York City. While in college he worked at WTIC-FM (Hartford, Connecticut). He later worked for WPLJ radio and Z-100 (WHTZ) radio, both in New York City.

Hammer appears as a model in the book Heartthrob: A Hundred Years of Beautiful Men (in which he is described as possessing "almost-too-good-looking-for-words attractiveness") and the October 1999 issue of Gym magazine. He also appears in The Mane Thing, a book by stylist Kevin Mancuso.

Hammer also was the spokesperson for Milton Bradley's promotional tour of the Planet Hollywood board game.

Hammer was also a model in the Debbie Gibson's "What You Want" music video (2001) which involved a bathtub scene. The two were wearing clothes and the tub was filled with cold water 1/4 of the way up (no hot water available) and bubbles to the top.
