= Bella Shaw =

American journalist and news presenter

Bella Shaw is an American TV personality, journalist and news presenter, known for her work on TV infomercials and prior work on CNN from 1984-1993 when her contract as co-host of CNN's "Showbiz Today" program was not renewed.

== Professional life ==
Shaw attended the University of Oklahoma, where she earned a degree in journalism while participating in the university's radio station, and began working at WKY Radio in 1976. There, she was a news presenter until being laid off when the station switched to FM format; however, at that time, KTVY (now KFOR-TV) was located in the same building, and she began working there instead.

After seven years at KTVY, during which she was only given shifts on weekends, Shaw concluded that KTVY offered her no chance for career advancement, and applied to the then-nascent Cable News Network, on the grounds that "Ted Turner was hiring a lot of people from Oklahoma". Shaw's first day at CNN was July 12, 1984; although she had not been scheduled to appear on-camera that day, the regular news anchor was temporarily unavailable, and Shaw was chosen to report the news that Walter Mondale had selected Geraldine Ferraro as his running mate for the 1984 presidential election.

In 1989, she became the co-host of CNN's Showbiz Today, replacing Bill Tush; however, in 1993, CNN chose not to renew her contract, replacing her on Showbiz Today with Jim Moret, which Variety attributed to Moret being perceived as "more serious" than Shaw.

She subsequently joined Santa Clarita Valley local TV broadcasting with Time Warner Cable.

Today, Shaw anchors weekly for Torrance Citicable’s “COVID-19 Today”. This show airs daily Monday-Thursday locally.

== Personal life ==
Shaw was born in Austria, where her father was serving in the United States army, and raised in Fort Sill, Oklahoma.

She has twice been married: first to doctor Jim Hays, and later to banker Mark Soroko who died suddenly in March 2010.

== Filmography ==
Year	Title	Role	Notes
1985	Invasion U.S.A.	Newscaster #3	
2008	Killer Tumbleweeds	New York Anchor	
2022	The Santa Clauses	Interviewer	
