= Blues for Mister Charlie =

1964 stage play by James Baldwin

- First edition cover
- Author: James Baldwin
- Language: English
- Genre: Play
- Publisher: Dial Press
- Publication date: 1964
- Publication place: United States
- Media type: Theatre Script
- Pages: 158

Blues for Mister Charlie is the second play by American writer James Baldwin, a social commentary drama in three acts. It was first produced and published in 1964. The play's program notes declared it was "dedicated to the memory of Medgar Evers, his widow and children, and to the memory of the dead children of Birmingham." Civil rights activist Evers was murdered in 1963, the same year that saw four girls killed in Birmingham's 16th Street Baptist Church bombing; both crimes were committed by members of white supremacist groups opposed to racial integration and equal rights for African-Americans.

The play is loosely based on the Emmett Till murder that occurred in Money, Mississippi, before the Civil Rights Movement began.

== Plot ==
=== Act I ===
Act I opens up with the Reverend Meridian Henry coaching negro students through their lines. They are interrupted by Parnell James, who brings them the news that Lyle Britten will be arrested for the murder of Richard Henry. When he leaves to inform Britten about his future arrest, the students talk amongst themselves about the struggles they face as black people.

The scene shifts to Lyle and his wife, Jo Britten, in their store. His wife brings up the death of Richard, fearful that her husband may go to jail because of a past transgression he had with another black man who died as a result of the confrontation. Lyle defends himself by claiming self-defense. When Parnell James arrives, Lyle assures both of them that they need not worry.

The scene shifts into a flashback with Richard and his grandmother, Mother Henry. He confronts her about the death of his mother whom he believes was pushed down the stairs, though Mother Henry claims she fell down by accident. Richard swears that he will protect himself from the white man at all costs, showing her a gun. Before she leaves, his grandmother pleads with him to get rid of the gun, but he takes it with him.

Soon after, Pete and Juanita, arrive to take Richard out to Papa D.’s bar. Richard brags to Pete, Juanita, and Papa D. about his exploits with white women showing them nude photos of the white women he supposedly slept with. They tell him to hide the photos so as not to cause trouble. Richard puts them away. Later, he confides in Juanita about his time up north and how he became a drug addict, hit rock bottom, and then became clean. Lyle arrives and asks Papa D. to make some change. He watches Juanita and Richard dancing, and on his way out he "jostles" Juanita. Richard and Lyle exchange words before Lyle leaves. Later that night, Richard returns home to talk with his father, the reverend, about taking the nonviolent route and hands over his gun.

The flashback ends, and the scene opens with Parnell returning to the church to reassure Reverend Meridian Henry that Lyle will be taken to court. But he also makes a point of saying that Lyle will not be convicted. Parnell tells the reverend to let the matter go. The scene ends as he departs.

=== Act II ===
Act II opens with Jo Britten and the white townspeople in her home. They discuss how frightened they have become of the black townspeople lately. Soon Parnell James arrives and gets into a debate with the white men over his paper and his place in the black community. Lyle arrives some time later, and the others continue to tease Parnell as he proposes to put black people in the jury at Lyle’s trial. The white townspeople soon leave, with only the Brittens and Parnell in the house. Lyle leaves to take a shower.

When Jo and Parnell are alone, she confronts him about her husband, Lyle, sleeping with Willa Mae who was the wife of Old Bill, the black man that Lyle had killed some years before. Parnell refuses to discuss it. Jo asks Parnell if he had ever loved a black woman. When he says yes, Jo says that it is possible that Lyle had loved Willa Mae and that he had killed Old Bill out of spite. She continues, saying that if it is possible that Lyle killed Old Bill, it is also possible that he killed Richard. Lyle returns with his son and passes him to Jo.

The scene changes to Lyle and Parnell in the store talking about Lyle’s relationship with Willa Mae. They also discuss the first time Lyle met Richard. Again, Lyle denies killing Richard. Jo arrives with their son, ending the discussion.

Another flashback occurs, showing Richard entering Brittens’ store despite Lorenzo telling him not to. Richard goes to buy two cokes for 20 cents, but only has a $20 bill. He has an awkward exchange with Jo Britten, she feels threatened, and Lyle, who had been in the backroom, enters and tells Richard to leave. Lorenzo, who did not enter the store, shouts for Richard to leave. Richard and Lyle continue to argue, and Richard knocks Lyle to the ground during the ensuing altercation, thereby humiliating Lyle in front of his wife. Richard leaves the store with Lorenzo, while Lyle issues a warning. The flashback ends, returning to Parnell and Lyle talking in the store.

Lyle slips up and describes how Richard’s body was left face down in high weeds. When Parnell asks how he knew that, Lyle claims to have read it in the newspaper. Parnell leaves soon after to go to Richard’s funeral, ending the second act.

=== Act III ===
Act III opens with Lyle’s trial; it has been two months since Richard’s death. Several people are called to take the stand as witnesses.

Jo lies about the events at the store and claims Richard attempted to sexually assault her. Papa D, the owner of the bar, explained that he witnessed Richard and Lyle leaving together one night when he was closing the bar. Lorenzo tells a simplified version of the events that transpired in the store and defends Richard's character saying he had "kicked" his drug habit. Lorenzo says Richard did not have nude photos of white women (because he did not know Richard had them). Juanita defends Richard saying he no longer does drugs and that she was trying to convince him to move North again and take her with him. Mother Henry and Reverend Meridian Henry both lie about Richard owning a gun. Parnell James defends Richard through his close friendship with Reverend Henry, but he refused to say Jo's version of the story was a lie, leaving the all white jury to believe it was true.

The court finds Lyle not guilty. Then, another flashback shows Lyle killing an unarmed, nonviolent Richard for refusing to apologize for the altercation in the store and then disposing of his body in the high weeds.

Back in the courtroom, Lyle tells Reverend Henry that he will never apologize for Richard's death. The play ends with the black characters leaving to go on a protest March, and a downtrodden Parnell joining them.

== Characters ==
Meridian Henry – the Black minister. His son is Richard Henry.

Richard Henry – son of Meridian. He comes back from the North and is murdered by Lyle Britten.

Papa D. – Black owner of a juke joint, known to “fraternize” with the white people of Plaguetown, among them Lyle Britten.

Parnell James – editor of the local newspaper, friend to both Lyle and Meridian. He fights to have a (“fair”) trial.

Lyle Britten – white store owner, grew up in poverty. Has killed a Black man before, he shoots Richard at the beginning of the play.

Jo Britten – Lyle’s wife. She questions Lyle’s innocence, but never publicly. She lies for him on trial.

Juanita – Friend to Richard and Meridian. She develops romantic feelings for Richard.

Lorenzo, Pete, Arthur, Tom, Ken – Black students, some are friends of Richard’s.

Hazel, Lillian, Susan, Ralph, Ellis, Rev. Phelps, George – white townspeople who rally around Lyle.

The State, Counsel of the Bereaved

=== Title explanation ===
"Mister Charlie" is a phrase used by African Americans that refers to the white man.

== Analysis ==
=== Critiques of Christianity ===
James Baldwin uses this play as a vehicle to address his issues with Christianity, a religion historically used to justify the enslavement of Africans. He argues that Christianity is a type of plague that “has the power to destroy every human relationship." Through his character Lorenzo, he denounces it for its ability to be used to preach passivity while endorsing violence. Lorenzo articulates the lack of empathy that Christianity has for the Black community, calling it “the white God” who ignores others’ suffering at the hands of the irrational. He accuses the reverend of praying to a god that only cares for those who are white and asserts that it is this god who is responsible for the destruction of Black lives.

=== Morality ===
Baldwin challenges the common beliefs of morality between white people and Black people. With whites as the targeted audience, he associates his black characters with traits historically mainly given to white characters, such as “godliness, courage and braggadocio." His white characters possess the weaknesses stereotypically attributed to Black people, such as “lust, lack of moral strength, and violence." By situating his characters to reflect the opposite of what is expected by his audience, Baldwin places the viewers in a position to acknowledge the complexities of human nature. His restricting the white community to one dimension of human nature, as the white community does to the Black, compels the white audience to come face-to-face with how humanity may be stripped by the act of shrinking one’s complexities.

== Selected productions ==
In 1964 the Actors Studio staged the play's first production which ran from Apr 23, 1964 - Aug 29, at the ANTA Playhouse. It was directed by Burgess Meredith starring Al Freeman Jr., Rip Torn, Pat Hingle, Ann Wedgeworth and Ralph Waite among others in the cast, and received critical praise from The New York Times. Later in 1965, the same production was remounted in London without Rip Torn in the key role of Lyle and drew a hostile reaction from London's critics

The Royal Exchange, Manchester staged a revival in 1992 directed by Greg Hersov with Paterson Joseph, David Schofield, Nicholas Le Prevost and Wyllie Longmore. The performances ran from 22 October-14 November.

In 2004, Talawa Theatre Company co-produced the play under Paulette Randall's direction with New Wolsey Theatre in partnership with (then known as) the Tricycle Theatre. The play was well received.

== Awards and nominations ==
=== Original Broadway production ===
Year	Award	Category	Nominee	Result
1964	Tony Award	Best Featured Actress in a Play	Diana Sands	Nominated

== See also ==
- Civil rights movement in popular culture

"Baldwin's Blues for Mister Charlie," by Tom F. Driver, Christianity and Crisis 24.11 (June 22, 1964) pp. 123–26. Printed also in The Village Voice, (June, 1964); and in Negro Digest 13.11 (Sep. 1964) pp. 34–42. Available online at https://books.google.com/books?id=77IDAAAAMBAJ&dq=%22Tom+F.+Driver%22+Blues&q=Driver#v=snippet&q=Driver&f=false. This thrice-printed favorable review of the play was initially written for The Reporter Magazine, which turned it down because Baldwin had fallen out of favor with the magazine's publisher, Max Ascoli.
