= Quotative =

Grammatical device marking speech

A quotative (abbreviated quot) is a grammatical device to mark quoted speech. When a quotation is used, the grammatical person and tense of the original utterance is maintained, rather than adjusting it as would be the case with reported speech. It can be equated with "spoken quotation marks."

== Dutch ==
In Dutch, the preposition van can be used to introduce direct speech:

Ik zei er van Japie sta stil (a line from a children's song).
I said, 'Japie [colloquial diminutive of Jaap], stand still.'

Quotative van can be used in combination with a verb of speech, as in the above example, a noun designating something with message-carrying content, or a light verb, e.g. a copula (like for English quotative like).

In the specific colloquial combination zoiets hebben van (literally, "have something suchlike of"), the subsequent quoted speech conveys a (possibly unspoken) feeling:

De ouders hadden zoiets van laten we het maar proberen, wie weet lukt het.
The parents were like, let's try it, who knows it will work.

== English ==
In English the most common quotative has historically been the verb say:

He said, 'You'll love it.' And I said, 'You can't be serious!'

Starting in the late 20th century, the expression be like began to be used frequently as a quotative in colloquial speech:

He was like, 'You'll love it.' And I was like, 'You can't be serious!'

In speech, the word like in this use is typically followed by a brief pause, indicated here with a comma. This quotative construction is particularly common for introducing direct speech indicating someone's attitude.

== Georgian ==
Georgian marks quoted speech with one of two suffixes depending on the grammatical person of who made the original utterance, -მეთქი for the first person and -ო for the second and third person.

The following sentences show the use of the first person and non-first person quotative particles respectively. Note the preservation of both the person and tense of the original utterances:

=== First person quotative ===
მოხუცმა იტირა, როცა ვუთხარი, რომ თქვენი ვაჟიშვილი ჯარში უნდა წავიდეს -მეთქი.
Mokhutsma it'ira rotsa vutkhari rom tkveni vazhishvili jar-shi unda ts'avides metki.
he-ERG cry-AOR when {I told-AOR him} that your son-NOM {in the army} must {he goes-OPT} {1st person QUOT}
"The old man cried when I told him that his son had to enter the army" lit. "that 'your son has to enter the army.'"

=== Second and third person quotative ===
კახეთში კი ინტურისტის ექსკურსიას უნდა გაყვე ო.
K'akhet-shi k'i int'urist'is eksk'ursias unda gaqve o.
{to Kakheti} but Intourist-GEN excursion-DAT must {you accompany-OPT it} {3rd person QUOT}
"But (they said) that I had to accompany an Intourist excursion to Kakheti" lit. "that 'you must accompany'"

Note that this second sentence omits an overt verbum dicendi since the original speaker is already known, and context makes it clear that the speaker was the original addressee.

== Ancient Greek ==
Ancient Greek can mark quoted speech in prose with the subordinating conjunction ὅτι:

οἱ δὲ εἶπον ὅτι ἱκανοί ἐσμεν.
hoi dè eîpon hóti hikanoí esmen
they but said-AOR QUOT ready {we are}-PAI1P
"They said that they were ready" lit. "that 'we are ready'"

== Japanese ==
In Japanese, the quotative と [to] is used to indicate direct speech in this sentence:

石田さん は 「トマトが 好きじゃない」 と 言いました。
Ishida-san wa {"tomato ga} {suki janai"} to iimashita.
{Mr. Ishida} TOP tomato-NOM like-NEG QUOT say-PAST-POL
"Mr. Ishida said that he didn't like tomatoes" lit. "that 'I don't like tomatoes'"

The following example shows the preservation of both grammatical person and the tense in a quoted utterance using the quotative particle:

彼女 は 僕 に 「あなたが 好き だ」 と 言った。
Kanojo wa boku ni {"anata ga} suki da" to itta.
She TOP I DAT you-NOM like COP QUOT say-PAST
"She told me that she liked me" lit. "that 'I like you'"

See Japanese grammar for more examples of when と (to) is used.

== Korean ==
In Korean, the marker 라고 rago follows the quoted sentence clause, marking direct quotation as follows:

{주현 씨} 는 저 에게 "니가 좋아" 라고 말했어요.
{Joohyun sshi} neun jeo ege "niga joha" rago malhaesseoyo.
{Ms. Joohyun} TOP I DAT "you-NOM like" QUOT say-PAST-POL
"Joohyun told me that she liked me." lit. "that 'I like you.'"

The verb 말하다 malhada, "to say", is often shortened to 하다 hada, meaning "to do". This is because the quotative marker alone makes it obvious the quote was said by someone, so saying the whole verb is redundant.

Indirect quotation works similarly, albeit using different markers. When quoting a plain sentence, the marker ㄴ/는다고 n/neundago (ㄴ다고 ndago after vowels, 는다고 neundago after consonants) is attached to the quoted verb. When quoting adjectives, 다고 dago is used:

{주현 씨} 는 저 에게 제가 좋다고 했어요.
{Joohyun sshi} neun jeo ege jega johtago haesseoyo.
{Ms. Joohyun} TOP I DAT I-NOM like-QUOT say-PAST-POL
"Joohyun told me that she liked me."

When quoting the copula 이다 ida, the marker 라고 rago is used instead:

{경수 씨} 는 저 에게 아직 학생이라고 했어요.
{Kyungsoo sshi} neun jeo ege ajik haksaeng-irago haesseoyo.
{Mr. Kyungsoo} TOP I DAT still student-COP-QUOT say-PAST-POL
"Kyungsoo told me that he's still a student."

Question sentences are marked with the quotative marker 냐고 nyago, which changes to 느냐고 neunyago after verbs ending in a consonant and to 으냐고 eunyago after adjectives ending in a consonant.

저 는 {윤아 씨} 에게 망고 를 먹어본 적이 있냐고 물어봤어요.
Jeo neun {yoona sshi} ege mang-go reul meogeobon jeogi innyago mureobwasseoyo.
I TOP {Ms. Yoona} DAT mango SUBJ eat-try-PAST-ATTR experience-SUBJ have-Q-QUOT ask-PAST-POL
"I asked Yoona if she has tried mango." lit. "has the experience of eating mango"

저 는 {종대 씨} 에게 공원 으로 가고 싶으냐고 물어봤어요.
Jeo neun {Jongdae sshi} ege gong-won euro gago shipeunyago mureobwasseoyo.
I TOP {Mr. Jongdae} DAT park towards go-to want-Q-QUOT ask-PAST-POL
"I asked Jongdae whether he would like to go to the park."

== Sanskrit ==
In Sanskrit, the quotative marker iti is used to convey the meaning of someone (or something) having said something.

स भाषते इति ते तस्य गृहम् आगच्छन्ति
sa bhaṣati iti te tasya gṛham āgacchanti
He says QUOT they his house come
He says that they come to his house (He says, "They come to my house.")

== Sinhala ==
In the following English sentence, no word indicates the quoted speech.

John said, "Wow,"

That is indicated only typographically. In Sinhala, on the other hand, here is the equivalent sentence:

John Wow kiyalaa kivvaa

It has an overt indication of quoted speech after the quoted string Wow, the quotative kiyalaa.

== Telugu ==
In Telugu, traditionally the words andi (for female and neuter singular), meaning she said that or it said, annāḍu (for male singular), meaning he said that and annāru (for plural), meaning They said are used as quotative markers. However, in recent times, many Telugu speakers are resorting to use the Latin quotation marks ("...") to convey speech.

For example:

తను ఇంటికి వెళదాము అన్నాడు
tanu iṃṭiki veḻadāmu annāḍu
"He said that we will go to home," lit. "He said, 'We'll go home.'"

== Turkish ==
In Turkish, direct speech is marked by following it by a form of the verb demek ("to say"), as in

'Hastayım' dedi.
'I am ill', he said.

In particular, the word diye (literally "saying"), a participle of demek, is used to mark quoted speech when another verb of utterance than demek is needed:

'Hastayım mı?' diye sordu.
'Am I ill?', he asked.

In contrast, indirect speech uses the opposite order. The reported utterance is preceded by the verb of utterance and introduced by the conjunctive particle ki, comparable to English "that":

Dedi ki hastaydı.
He said that he was ill.

== See also ==
- Verbum dicendi
- Quoted speech
- Reported speech
