= Brooke Anderson =

American journalist (born 1978)

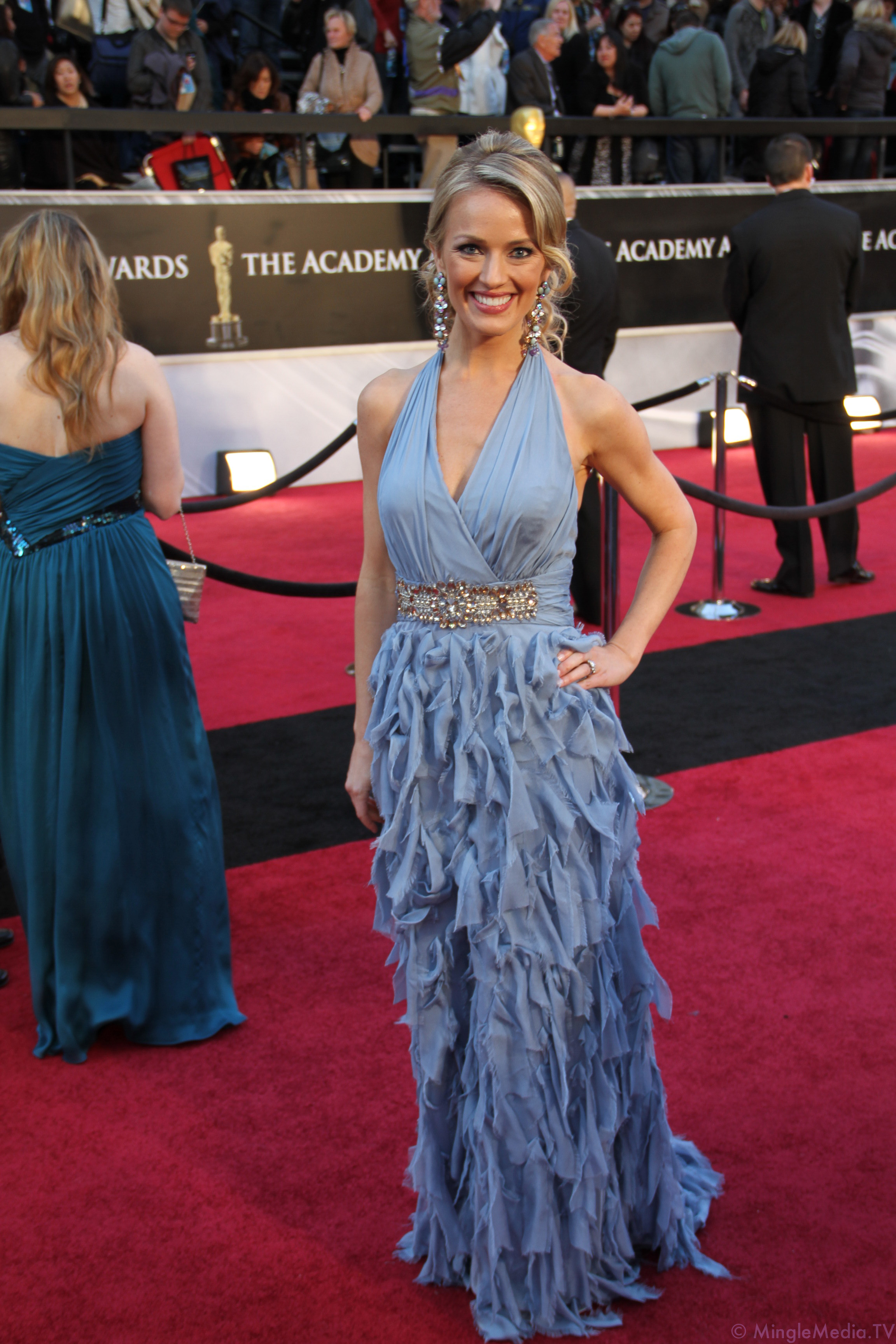
- Anderson at the 2011 Academy Awards
- Born: Brooke Victoria Anderson; May 13, 1978 (age 48); Savannah, Georgia, U.S.
- Education: University of Georgia
- Occupation: Correspondent for Inside Edition
- Years active: 2000–present
- Spouse: James Arthur Walker III (m. 2005)
- Children: 3

Brooke Victoria Anderson (born May 13, 1978) is a former co-host of The Insider, and is now a correspondent for Inside Edition. Previously, she was a culture and entertainment anchor and producer for CNN and served as co-host for Showbiz Tonight on HLN. Based in CNN's Los Angeles, California bureau, Anderson joined the network in July 2000.

Anderson graduated in 2000 with honors from the University of Georgia's Henry W. Grady College of Journalism and Mass Communication with a bachelor's degree in broadcast journalism. She is a member of the Kappa Delta sorority.

She has covered numerous events for CNN and Headline News, including the 2006 Cannes film festival, the Academy Awards, the Emmys, the Golden Globes, the Sundance Film Festival, the MTV Video Music Awards, the NBA All-Star Weekend, Fall Fashion Week in New York City and Atlanta's Music Midtown.

In February 2003, she received the Daily Point of Light Award for volunteerism from President George W. Bush.

In January 2012, she guest starred on Days of Our Lives, playing a reporter who interviewed John Black in episode 11754.

== Personal life ==
She is married to James Arthur Walker III. They have three children: two daughters and a son.
