= Mister Charlie =

Pejorative expression

Mister Charlie is a pejorative expression formerly used within the African-American community to refer to an imperious white man. Occasionally, it refers to a black man who is arrogant and perceived as "acting white". The term is sometimes written as Mr. Charlie, Mister Charley, or other variations. The expression is rarely used by young African-Americans in the 21st century.

The expression was in use during the 19th century, much like the female equivalent, Miss Ann. Miss Ann was an expression used among slaves to refer to the woman of the house, usually the wife of the slave owner, and any other white woman that the slaves had to serve. Mister Charlie was the slave owner, or any other white man exploiting, or being condescending towards, slaves.

Cassell's Dictionary of Slang (2005) argues that in the 1920s, "Mister Charlie" meant "any white man," but by the 1970s it had evolved to mean "the man in power."

In the 1960s the phrase was associated with the Civil Rights Movement in the United States and became nationally familiar. It appeared in the title of James Baldwin's play Blues for Mister Charlie (1964) and in the third verse of Malvina Reynolds's protest song "It Isn't Nice" (1967):

We have tried negotiations / And the three-man picket line, / Mr. Charlie didn't see us / And he might as well be blind. / Now our new ways aren't nice / When we deal with men of ice, / But if that is Freedom's price, / We don't mind.

Also – and obliquely related to the African-American sense of usage as a pejorative – the rock band Grateful Dead performed an original song during their early (c. 1970–1973) band years entitled "Mr. Charlie". It appears only once on an official label LP release as a live track from their "Europe '72" triple album. The band stopped performing the song following the death of the song's co-creator and lead vocalist, Ron "Pigpen" McKernan. In 2018, the song was added to the repertoire of Dead & Company, a band including former Grateful Dead members, being sung by John Mayer.

== See also ==
- Gammon (insult)
- House Negro
- Miss Ann
- The Man
- Uncle Tom
