= Material girl (disambiguation) =

Material girl or material girls may refer to:

== Arts and entertainment ==
- "Material Girl", a 1984 song by Madonna
- Material Girl (TV series), a 2010 UK TV series
- Material Girls, a 2006 US film
- Material Girls: Why Reality Matters for Feminism, a 2021 book by Kathleen Stock
- "Material Girl", a song by Saucy Santana

== Other uses ==
- A female person (girl or woman) who is materialistic
- A sobriquet for the American singer Madonna, or her Material Girl Collection clothing line designed with her daughter Lourdes Ciccone Leon
