= Sherri Sylvester =

American television personality

Sherri Sylvester (born Sherri Kay Sylvester 1959) was a longtime entertainment reporter for CNN, and sometimes filled in as hostess of Showbiz Today. She was educated at Indiana University Bloomington. Sylvester has subsequently worked as a producer for CBS News, and works with Women Media Pros specializing in Media Interview Training and Media Relations.
