= Quotation =

Repetition of one expression as part of another one

A quotation or quote is a phrase or passage from speech or text that someone has said or written, or might say or write. In oral speech, it is the representation of an utterance (i.e. of something that a speaker actually said) that is introduced by a quotative marker, such as a verb of saying. For example: John said: "I saw Mary today". Quotations in oral speech are also signaled by special prosody in addition to quotative markers. In written text, quotations are signaled by quotation marks. Quotations are also used to present well-known statement parts that are explicitly attributed by citation to their original source; such statements are marked with (punctuated with) quotation marks.

As a form of transcription, direct or quoted speech is spoken or written text that reports speech or thought in its original form phrased by the original speaker. In narrative, it is usually enclosed in quotation marks, but it can be enclosed in guillemets (« ») in some languages. The cited speaker either is mentioned in the tag (or attribution) or is implied. Direct speech is often used as a literary device to represent someone's point of view. Quotations are also widely used in spoken language when an interlocutor wishes to present a proposition that they have come to know via hearsay.

== Comparison between direct, indirect, and free indirect speech ==
- Quoted or direct speech: (Note: Both direct speech and indirect speech purport to report the speech or thoughts of an original speaker. Some writers use the terms reported direct speech and reported indirect speech)

Direct speech and indirect speech can also refer to the difference between speech acts where the illocutionary force is conveyed directly and indirectly, respectively. Thus, "What time is it?" is a direct speech act that might also be expressed by the indirect speech act "Do you know what time it is?"

He laid down his bundle and thought of his misfortune. "And just what pleasure have I found since I came into this world?" he asked.

- Reported or normal indirect speech:

He laid down his bundle and thought of his misfortune. He asked himself what pleasure he had found since he came into the world.

- Free indirect speech:

He laid down his bundle and thought of his misfortune. And just what pleasure had he found since he came into this world?

A crucial semantic distinction between direct and indirect speech is that direct speech purports to report the exact words that were said or written, whereas indirect speech is a representation of speech in one's own words.

The distinction between indirect speech and free indirect speech is mostly one of style, hence free indirect speech is sometimes described as a free indirect style.

== As a literary device ==
A quotation can also refer to the repeated use of units of any other form of expression, especially parts of artistic works: elements of a painting, scenes from a movie or sections from a musical composition.

=== Reasons for using ===
Quotations are used for a variety of reasons: to illuminate the meaning or to support the arguments of the work in which it is being quoted, to provide direct information about the work being quoted (whether in order to discuss it, positively or negatively), to pay homage to the original work or author, to make the user of the quotation seem well-read, and/or to comply with copyright law. Quotations are also commonly printed as a means of inspiration and to invoke philosophical thoughts from the reader. Pragmatically speaking, quotations can also be used as language games (in the Wittgensteinian sense of the term) to manipulate social order and the structure of society.

=== Common sources ===
Famous quotations are frequently collected in books that are sometimes called quotation dictionaries or treasuries. Of these, Bartlett's Familiar Quotations, The Oxford Dictionary of Quotations, The Columbia Dictionary of Quotations, The Yale Book of Quotations and The Macmillan Book of Proverbs, Maxims, and Famous Phrases are considered among the most reliable and comprehensive sources. Diaries and calendars often include quotations for entertainment or inspirational purposes, and small, dedicated sections in newspapers and weekly magazines—with recent quotations by leading personalities on current topics—have also become commonplace.

=== Misquotations ===
Many quotations are routinely incorrect or attributed to the wrong authors, and quotations from obscure or unknown writers are often attributed to far more famous writers. Examples of this are Winston Churchill, to whom many political quotations of uncertain origin are attributed, and Oscar Wilde, to whom anonymous humorous quotations are sometimes attributed.

Some quotations commonly believed to be quotations from literature, film, etc. do not actually appear in the source material, but are paraphrases of phrases that do. The Star Trek catchphrase "Beam me up, Scotty" did not appear in that form in the original series. Other misquotations include "Just the facts, ma'am" (attributed to Jack Webb's character of Joe Friday on Dragnet), "Heavy lies the crown" from Shakespeare's Play Henry IV, Part 2, "Elementary, my dear Watson" (attributed to Sherlock Holmes; it was, however, said in the films The Adventures of Sherlock Holmes and The Return of Sherlock Holmes), "Luke, I am your father" (attributed to Darth Vader in Star Wars), "Play it again, Sam" (attributed to Ilsa in Casablanca), "Do you feel lucky, punk?" (attributed to Harry Callahan in Dirty Harry) and "We don't need no stinkin' badges!" (attributed to Gold Hat in The Treasure of the Sierra Madre).

=== Quotative inversion ===
Quotative inversion occurs in sentences where the direct quotation can occur before a verb of saying or after a verb of saying. It can trigger inversion of the verb and the verb's subject. Subject-verb inversion occurs most often in written works, being rare in speech. Quotations may appear before the inverted verb, but can also appear after the subject, such as: "I am going to follow you all the rest of my life," declared the man and Said the woman: "I see you with both my eyes."

Also referred to as inverted quotations, this technique of reversing the sequence of an existing phrase or formulation is commonly found in biblical texts, particularly the Hebrew Bible and the New Testament. It serves to evoke various emotional and rhetorical effects, mainly to draw extra attention from the reader or listener. By reversing a previously established sequence, authors can introduce surprise, emphasize key points, or create contrasts that highlight the text's significance and its connections to other biblical passages.

==== Syntax ====
In syntactic terms, these direct quotations can be presented in two forms. The first is as the complement of a quotative verb (e.g. Marie said: "My brother has arrived"), and the second being as a head clause with a quotative adjunct (e.g. "My brother has arrived", Marie announces). The verb phrase can be further expanded to include a complement, such as: "They'll never make it!" cried John to Mary. Subjects must precede the complement, otherwise the structure formed will be ungrammatical (e.g. *"They'll never make it!" cried to Mary John). Quotative inversion is only allowed when the verb is in the simple present or the simple past. The most common pairing is the verb said with a nominal subject, such as: "That's the whole trouble," said Gwen. Additionally, noun phrases are not permitted in addition to the subject when inversion takes place. They are allowed only when there is no subject-verb inversion, or when part of a preposition phrase.

a. "Why?" Gabrielle asked the attendant. - No subject-verb inversion
b. "Why?" asked Gabrielle of the attendant. - NP part of a preposition phrase
c. *"Why?" asked Gabrielle the attendant. - Subject-verb inversion unlikely with an NP in addition to the subject

In English, both verb-subject and subject-verb word orders are permitted:

a. "Don't turn back!" warned Marcel. - Verb-subject order
b. "Who's on first?" Swami demanded. - Subject-verb order

This, however, is not the case in all languages. For example, in Peninsular Spanish, this inversion is not allowed. Quotatives must follow verb-subject order:

a. «No, no es un enanito», rectifica el viejo. - Verb-subject order

"No, he is not a gnome", corrects the old man.

b. *«No, no es un enanito», el viejo rectifica. - Subject-verb order unlikely for introducing quotations

"No, he is not a gnome", the old man corrects.

=== Brackets in quotes in English language ===
Brackets are used to indicate an addition or a modification from the original quote. Various uses of brackets in quotes are:

- Clarification ("She [Michelle] is an expert in botany.")
- Change in capitalization ("[a]ccording to this article, this is untrue.")
- Translation ("Hola, soy Brandon [Hello, I am Brandon].")

When "[sic]" is added, it means that errors are present in the original text. For example, "Domestic cats are valued by hoomans [sic] for companionship."

== In spoken discourse ==
Traditionally, quotations—more specifically known as direct quotations—have been distinguished from indirect quotations. Direct quotations differ from indirect quotations in that they are reported from the perspective of the experiencer, while indirect quotations are reported from the perspective of the reporting speaker (e.g. "He said: 'I am leaving now'" versus "He said (that) he was leaving immediately"); are free in their syntactic form, while indirect quotations are subject to language-specific structural requirements (e.g. indirect quotations in many Indo-European languages are required to have the syntactic form of a well-formed declarative subordinate clause); incorporate extralinguistic material and pragmatic markers, while indirect quotations do not. Crucially, direct quotations have a performative aspect (i.e. occur simultaneously with re-enactments of previous behaviours), which indirect quotations lack.

Both direct and indirect quotations in spoken discourse are not intended to be verbatim reproductions of an utterance that has been produced. Instead, direct quotations convey the approximative meaning of such an utterance along with the way in which that utterance was produced. From a sociolinguistic perspective, a direct quotation in spoken discourse can therefore also be defined as "a performance whereby speakers re-enact previous behaviour (speech/thought/sound/voice effect and gesture) while assuming the dramatic role of the original source of this reported behaviour". Indirect quotations are simply paraphrases of something that a reporting speaker heard.

=== Reasons for using ===
Quotations are employed in spoken discourse for many reasons. They are often used by speakers to depict stories and events that have occurred in the past to other interlocutors. The speaker does not necessarily have to have been an original participant in the story or event. Therefore, they can quote something that they did not hear firsthand. Quotations are also used to express thoughts that have never been uttered aloud prior to being quoted. For example, while telling a story, a speaker quotes inner thoughts that they had during a specific situation. Finally, speakers use quotations to propose future dialogue for participants in a situation that may take place in the future. For example, two friends talk about their 10-year high school reunion that will take place in the future and propose what they would say. While future dialogue can be proposed for a situation that will likely happen, it can also be based on a situation that will not actually take place. In the latter usage, the proposed dialogue only exists in the conversational context.

The quoted material is usually not a verbatim replication of an utterance that someone originally said. Instead, quotations in spoken discourse reproduce what a speaker wishes to communicate to their recipients; quotations demonstrate something that someone said, the manner in which that person said it, and the current speaker's feelings about what was said. In this way, quotations are an especially effective storytelling device; the speaker is able to give a voice to the protagonists in their stories themselves, which allows the speaker's audience to experience the situation in the way that the speaker themselves experienced it.

=== Form ===
In most languages, quotations in spoken discourse are introduced by a verb of saying and a pronoun. For example, a quotation in English can be introduced by "She said". In some languages, there is a discourse marker in addition to the verb of saying that functions as verbal quotation marks. For example, Japanese uses the quotative particle (a type of quotative marker) to along with the conjugated verb of saying itta:

ゆき は あなた には 彼女 が 好き と 言った。
Yuki wa anata {ni wa} kanojo ga suki to itta.
Yuki TOP you {DAT (TOP)} her NOM like COM said
"Yuki said that you liked her."

Verbs of saying (known as quotative verbs when used to introduce quotations) and quotative particles are used as quotative markers, which signal quotations in utterances. Quotative evidentials are also used in some languages to indicate quoted speech (e.g. Cusco Quechua spoken in Peru, Nanti spoken in lowland southeastern Peru, Laal spoken in Chad).

==== Quotative markers ====
Quotative markers are used to mark a section of an utterance as quoted speech (i.e. a quotation). In oral speech, quotative markers act as quotation marks and often include a verb of saying (e.g. say). A quotative marker usually appears either before or after the reported speech or thought, depending on the syntax of the language. For example, compare the following languages:

===== English =====
In English, the quotative verb say occurs before the quotation:

a. She said "Will you answer the phone, will you answer the phone"

In American English, verbs such as be like, go, and be all are non-standard quotatives that are commonly used in colloquial speech. They are observed in the speech of young people not only in American English, but in other varieties of English as well (e.g. be like in New Zealand English, be like and go in Glasgow English). Though not semantically considered verbs of saying, they are used to convey the same meaning as such verbs. Like say, be like, go, and be all occur before the quotation:

b. I'm like "I'm so sorry you had to wait"
c. She went "Who are you going with?"
d. He's all "Okay, come with me come with me"

In conversational speech, the use of say and be like occurs at about the same frequency, though say tends to be used in more formal contexts (e.g. office hours between professors and students) and be like tends to occur in more informal contexts (e.g. a conversation between two young people).

In African American Vernacular English, talkin' 'bout occurs as a verb of quotation, introducing both direct and indirect quotes, as in:

e. They come talkin' 'bout they is scared of me!

===== Japanese =====
In Japanese, the quotative particle to along with the verb of saying iu (say) occur after the quotation; the conjugated form of iu (say) is itta:

太郎 は 晴海 を 憎んでいる と 言った。
Taro wa Harumi o nikundeiru to itta.
Taro TOP Harumi ACC hated COM said
"Taro said that he hated Harumi." lit. "that 'I hated Harumi'"

The quotative particle to can also occur with verbs of thinking, such as omou (think). Like to and iu (say), to and omou occur after the quotation.

===== Laal =====
In Laal, the quotative evidential mɨ́ is used for non-self quotation (i.e. quotation in which the speaker quotes someone else, not themself); it is used with a quotative verb ɓɨ́lá. The use of mɨ́ results in an indirect quotation translation. The quotative verb bɨ́lá occurs before the quotation, while the quotative evidential mɨ́ occurs within the quoted speech já mɨ́ nyàg tāā wó:

à_{i} ɓɨ́lá mɨ́ já_{*i/j} mɨ́ nyàg tāā wó
He say (say)that I QEV eat fish NEG
"He_{i} said that I_{*i/j} don't/didn't eat fish."

As the above sentence involves a non-self quotation, à (he) and já (I) have different indices to show that they refer to different referents; only this interpretation is well-formed. The interpretation in which they share identical indices is ill-formed (i.e. ungrammatical), as indicated by the asterisk.

In addition to quotative markers, speakers also use prosodic shifts, pauses, pronominal choices, and tense to detect the occurrence and boundaries of quotations in spoken utterances.

=== Syntax ===
Different versions of quotative verbs, particles, and evidentials can be used to express the same idea with varying nuances, often to frame how the primary speaker, or the person who is quoting, feels about a quotation. The syntax of quotations varies cross-linguistically. A primary speaker may use the tense and linguistic idiosyncrasies of the speech at the time it was uttered in a quotation, independent from the tense in the main clause in some languages, or use the same tense in both the main clause and quotation in other languages. They will also use coreferenced pronouns to the direct quotation's first-person subject in the main clause: She_{x} said, "I_{x}..."; they_{y} said "we_{y} ..." In many languages, the primary speaker may also attempt to quote an utterance in the same language the original speaker used, even if an interlocutor does not understand it; however, it is mainly context-dependent such as when telling stories.

==== Quotative verbs ====
Quotative verbs are lexical verbs that indicate the speech, thoughts, or perceptions of the original speaker.

Quotations can be introduced as the complement to a quotative verb or as the head phrase to an adjunct phrase containing a quotative verb in some languages like English and French.

	Quotation as complement	Quotation as head phrase adjunct
English	Marie said, "My brother has arrived."	"My brother has arrived," Marie said.
French	Marie a dit, "Mon frère est arrivé."	"Mon frère est arrivé," comme a dit Marie.

English also displays verb-second (V2) order vestige only in quotation contexts (quotative inversion), requiring the finite verb to appear in the second position of a clause. For example: "No no no" says Harry.

Direct and indirect quotations are sometimes not distinguishable. Traditionally, English uses an overt complementizer that after a quotative verb to indicate indirect quotation, but it is also seen to prompt direct quotation in some English varieties like Indian English, Hong Kong English, and Kenyan English.

Hong Kong English	After the movie I just said that "Oh Frank I cannot walk."
Indian English	Never a husband says that "I'll make a cup of tea okay, you sit. I'll make a cup of tea."
Kenyan English	So Kabuwe Abuwe told us that "If it is for wedding I am not going to contribute."

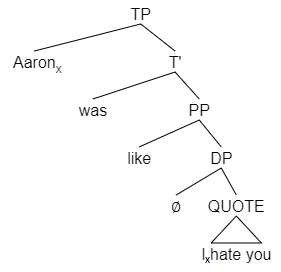
Quotative verb "be like" in English.

The newer quotative verb be like in English is used to only introduce direct quotations. Be like includes the use of the demonstrative that, which is null in most English varieties, but can be optionally overt in some varieties like Glasgow English. Dutch's quotative verb hebben zoiets van has a similar structure to Standard American English in that it has a null demonstrative that precedes the quotation. It differs from the English structures in that it uses an overt quantifier zoiets to be well-formed.

Standard North American English	Glasgow English	Dutch
[_{TP} Aaron [_{T'} was [_{PP} like [_{DP} ∅ [_{QUOTE} I hate you]]]]]	[_{TP} Aaron [_{T'} was [_{PP} like [_{DP} ∅ [_{QUOTE} I hate you]]]]]	[_{TP} Ik [_{T'} hebben [_{DP} zoiets [_{PP} van [_{DP} ∅ [_{QUOTE} I hate you]]]]]
*[_{TP} Aaron [_{T'} was [_{PP} like [_{DP} that [_{QUOTE} I hate you]]]]]	[_{TP} Aaron [_{T'} was [_{PP} like [_{DP} that [_{QUOTE} I hate you]]]]]	*[_{TP} Ik [_{T'} hebben [_{DP} ∅ [_{PP} van [_{DP} ∅ [_{QUOTE} I hate you]]]]]

==== Quotative particles ====
Quotative or hearsay particles are grammatical markers equivalent to full lexical verbs with meanings of "say, mention, tell, etc." In many languages, they are grammaticalized to different extremes from their previously lexical form. Common patterns of grammaticalization trajectories include verb to complementizer in many African and Asian languages and verb to tense-aspect-mood markers primarily in African languages, but also in Australian languages and multiple other language families.

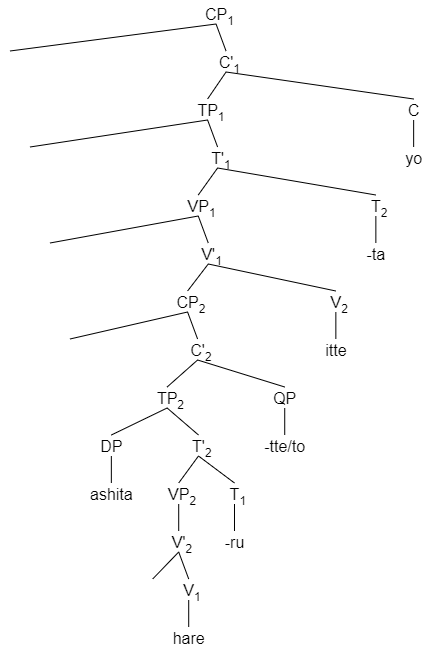
Quotative Particle "-tte" and "to" in Japanese.

Japanese, for example, uses a sentence-final quotative particle tte verbally to mean "I heard (quote)" with some uncertainty. In sentence-medial position, tte is sometimes regarded along with to to be either a quotative particle or complementizer meaning "I heard (quote)" with less uncertainty and often more knowledge of the origin of the quote.

明日 晴れる -って
ashita hareru tte.
tomorrow will-be-fine QUOT
"It will be fine tomorrow, I heard."

明日 晴れる って/と 言ってた よ
ashita hareru -tte/to itteta yo.
tomorrow will-be-fine QUOT said FP
"(X) said that it would be fine tomorrow."

Verbs of saying are highly restricted in Australian languages and almost always immediately proceed the complement verb.

wurlan wurr-u-miyangga bud-ma-ra-ngarrugu
word 3PL-FUT-know 3PL-say-PST-1PL.OBL.IRR
"They will know this word" they said to us.

==== Quotative evidentials ====
Quotative or hearsay evidentials provide knowledge of who or where information originated from in speech based on logical assumption. Languages indicate this in various ways: through grammatical marking, additional words and phrases, prosody, gestures, or systematic affixes of verbs. Quotative readings of evidentials are typologically rare. For example, English can express evidentials with an optional adverb, "Allegedly, Annie pulled the trigger." The interlocutor then knows the source of the quotation is from elsewhere, but this is not a quotative reading as there is no direct performative quoting or verbs of saying. Languages including Cusco Quechua, Kham, Tagalog, and Kaalallisut are documented as containing quotative evidentials. In languages with "true" quotative evidentials (which usually introduce quoted statements), it is also possible for them to occur with interrogatives and imperatives, yielding quoted interrogatives and quoted imperatives. Similar to quotative particles, quotative evidentials are usually grammaticalized from full lexical verbs.

Nhêengatú, a Tupí-Guaraní lingua franca of North-West Amazonia, has a reported evidential marker paá. An example scenario is as follows: X saw John go fishing. Mary then and asks X where John went. X replies "u-sú u-piniatika" (he went fishing). Later, Peter asks Mary where John went. She replies to Peter that she did not see John go herself, but rather heard it from a different source using the evidential marker "u-sú u-piniatika paá."

u-sú u-piniatika paá
3SG-go 3SG-fish REP
"He went fishing (they say/I was told)"

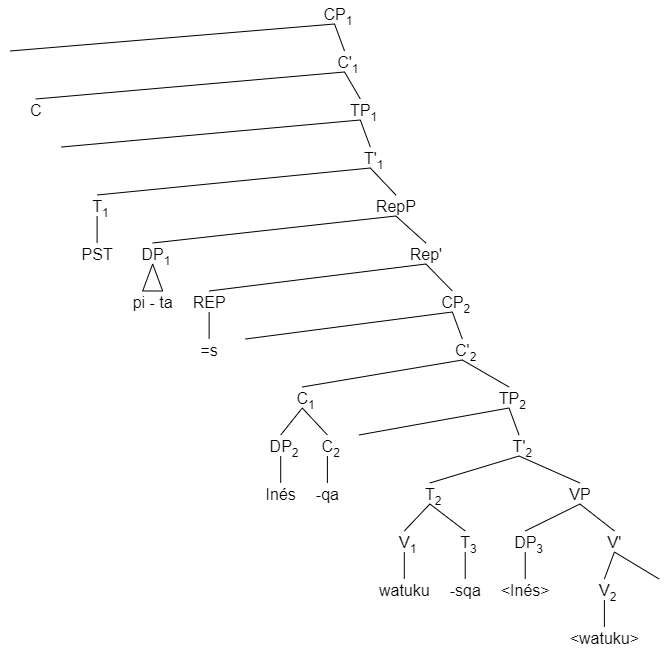
Quotative Evidential "=si" in Cusco Quechua.

Tagalog's quotative evidentials are used with imperative quotations.

kumain (ka) daw
eat.INF (you) REP
Someone said: Eat!

Cusco Quechua's quotative evidential comes as a derivation of a clitic, =si, for interrogative quotations.

pi-ta=s Inés-qa watuku-sqa
who-ACC=REP Inés-TOP visit-PST
'Someone said: Who did Inés visit?'

=== Hand gesture ===
Hand gesturing a quotation in a conversation can be done with air quotes.

== See also ==
- Block quotation
- Escape character
- Fallacy of quoting out of context
- Musical quotation
- Nested quotation
- Scare quotes
- Sic
- Use–mention distinction
- Quotation mark
- Right to quote
