= Himbo =

Slang term for an attractive, unintelligent man

Himbo, a portmanteau of the English masculine pronoun him and bimbo, is a slang term for a sexually attractive, hunky, naïve and dim-witted man. The first known use dates back to 1988; the word gained renewed popularity and attention in the 2010s and 2020s. Since its inception, the term and the stereotype it describes have generated a range of commentary and reactions from writers, entertainers, linguists, and cultural analysts.

== Etymology and definitions ==
Several dictionaries cite 1988 as the first time the word himbo was used. By then, the word bimbo, which earlier in the 20th century had been used for men and women, was being used predominately for women, so himbo, a combination of "him" and "bimbo", was coined to refer specifically to men. The New Partridge Dictionary of Slang and Unconventional English cites a 1988 Washington Post description of a "macho himbo who strutted the Croisette wearing a 16 foot python like a stole around his shoulders and neck".

Partridge defines himbo as "a man objectified by his good looks and presumed lack of intellectual qualities, a man who trades on this image, a gigolo".

Merriam-Webster's definition is "an attractive but vacuous man".

As the word generated popularity in the early 2020s, the word himbo began to be associated with a positive masculine archetype of being attractive, stupid, but also kind and goodhearted, as the "human version of a golden retriever—beautiful, incredibly well-intentioned, and dumb."

== Use in popular culture ==
=== 20th century ===
In 1995, Sherri Sylvester of CNN interviewed male Hollywood celebrities about the use of the term "himbo" and sexual objectification of men in entertainment and received a range of reactions. "There's a great word," said actor Keanu Reeves. "I love that. I read that and laughed my head off." Tom Selleck said he was "always flattered to be called a sex symbol." David Charvet of Baywatch noted, "You find yourself doing a show for three years where you are sticking your chest out and your shoulders are back and you're holding in your stomach and you realize that that's so boring after a while."

In a 1994 interview, sociologist Michael Kimmel, who analyzes the himbo stereotype in his book Manhood in America: A Cultural History, said there are two types of himbos, those created for women, like the model Fabio, and those created for men, like Arnold Schwarzenegger. The man's himbo, says Kimmel, is usually known for having some kind of prowess, like Charles Atlas or Schwarzenegger, whereas the woman's himbo is 'kinder and gentler' like Woody Harrelson or, like Fabio, "a male Zsa Zsa Gabor... famous for doing very little."

"You could legitimately call it a victory for men, that we now have men famous for doing nothing," Kimmel noted. He also observes that the origin of the himbo stereotype can be seen in mid-twentieth century television shows, whose audiences were primarily women, "that traditionally present Mother as the all-wise and Father as a bit of a bumbling idiot".

In her 1995 book Beyond the Double Bind: Women and Leadership, communications professor Kathleen Hall Jamieson uses bimbo and himbo as examples of 'linguistic reversal' which "creates a range of condemnation applicable to men that mirrors that for women." "Each of these moves invites us to examine our presuppositions", she states, and "makes it less likely that language penalizing women will be taken for granted in future exchanges." Another example she cites is trophy wife and trophy husband.

Season 1 Episode 8 of the TV series Oh, Grow Up was called "Himbo" (1999).

=== 21st century ===
In 2006, Seventeen editor Atoosa Rubenstein and psychologist Jeff Gradere spoke on the Today Show about the "himbo cultural phenomenon". Rubenstein describes variations of himbos like the Hound Dog Himbo and the Socialite Himbo, and compares current actors to the different categories. ""The girls love [himbos] because they are malleable." she said. "As women become more successful, they want a guy who isn't going to take over their lives....they are the wave of the future." Gradere was more critical of the phenomenon, saying that boys trying to 'dumb down' or use their sexuality to get attention or financial support was no better than girls doing the same thing." "We understand the value of women taking on more masculine roles and men assuming what were once considered more traditional female roles. However, somewhere along the way, himbos have warped this idea and turned it into a free ride at the expense of women, which is disrespectful and manipulative."

By the early 2000s, himbo was frequently being used in entertainment. In an interview for the 2004 documentary Frodo Is Great... Who Is That?!!, Jemaine Clement stated that fans of the eponymous Lord of the Rings extra "[make] him out to be quite a himbo". A 2006 episode of the TV series Freddie was called "Freddie the Himbo". In 2007, the Ugly Betty character Daniel Meade was described as a "himbo" in Season 1, Episode 11 of the show.

Lauren Bans of GQ Magazine discussed the rise of the himbo character in entertainment in her 2012 article, "Bimbos with Balls", noting the proliferation of "a new breed of buffed up hollow men" was replacing female bimbo characters in shows like New Girl, Cougar Town, and Parks and Recreation, 30 Rock, as well as movies like Magic Mike and Showgirls. Citing even earlier himbo appearances in Seinfeld and Friends, Bans theorizes that the 21st century has spawned a "Golden Age of himbodom", based on a new Hollywood vision of women as "crass sexual aggressors" who "need subjects to crassly sexually aggress".

In the chapter "Let's Hear it for the Boy Toy" of their book The Hookup Handbook: A Single Girl's Guide to Living It Up, authors Jessica Rozler and Andrea Lavinthal describe a variety of himbo 'types' such as actors, bartenders, models, and personal trainers, as well as identifying features of different kinds of "Himbo Hookups", including The Beauty and The Beast Complex, the Sugar Mama, and so on.

Noreen Malone of The New Republic correlates the rise of the himbo stereotype and its "ornamental masculinity" in 2012 with the disappearance of opportunities for 'real expressions of manly manliness', especially for working-class men, as well as to a shift in power dynamics between men and women.

In the early 2020s, after a Twitter user called the term himbo "ableist", a flurry of news articles and commentary about the term appeared, some of which defended the positive attributes of the himbo stereotype, like emotional intelligence and loyalty.

== Synonyms ==
Synonyms for himbo include bimboy, mimbo, boy toy and Blank Chuck.

The Jamaican version, according to Dancehall Dictionary, which defines himbo as "a young man paid for his sexual services by an older woman", is 'tadpole'.

In a speech on hookup culture at Chico State University, a presenter included himbo on a list of synonyms for 'sexually promiscuous man' that also included Casanova, ladies man, prostitute, man hoe, and Benedict".

In a UK reader survey reported in the book Language, Power and Society, himbo was offered as a synonym for toy boy, along with other expressions like joy boy, lap chap, and boncubine.

Some commentators have continued in the late 20th and early 21st centuries to use the original term "bimbo" when referring to someone as an unintelligent, vacuous, or brutish man, such as a reporter's description of Dan Quayle or Stephen Richter's reflections on Donald Trump. In 2020, Biden got the same treatment.
