= Bimbo =

Slang term

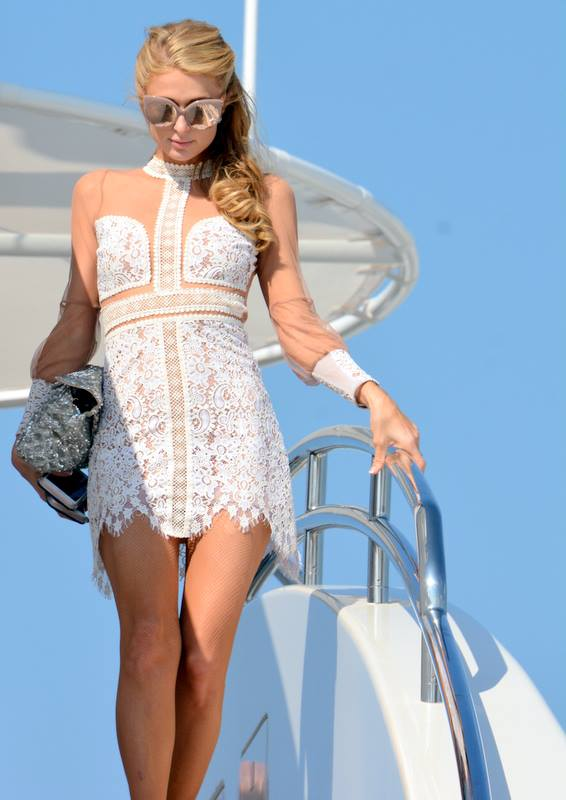
Paris Hilton claims to maintain a "bimbo" image

Bimbo is a slang term for a conventionally attractive, sexualized, and dim-witted woman. It is commonly employed for women who are blonde, have curvaceous physiques, wear large amounts of makeup, and dress in revealing attire, and is closely associated with the "dumb blonde" archetype.

== History ==
The word bimbo literally means "male infant" in Italian (the feminine equivalent is bimba). According to the Oxford English Dictionary, it entered American slang in the early 20th century, first appearing in 1919. The original definition was "a man, especially a young and foolish one". It was not until the 1920s that it came to be used for women. In 1920, Frank Crumit, Billy Jones, and Aileen Stanley all recorded versions of "My Little Bimbo Down on the Bamboo Isle", with words by Grant Clarke and music by Walter Donaldson. The song uses the term "bimbo" to describe an island girl of questionable virtue. In the 1928 silent film The Godless Girl, an inmate in a girls' reformatory addresses a new arrival as "Bimbo". In Desert Nights (1929) it is used to describe a wealthy female crook, and in The Broadway Melody (1929), an angry Bessie Love calls a chorus girl a bimbo.

In the 1940s, bimbo was still being used to refer to both men and women, as in for example the comic novel Full Moon by P. G. Wodehouse, who wrote of "bimbos who went about the place making passes at innocent girls after discarding their wives like old tubes of toothpaste".

The term died out again for much of the 20th century until it became popular again in the 1980s and 1990s, with political sex scandals. As bimbo began to be used increasingly for females, male variations of the word began to surface, such as himbo, which refers to an attractive but unintelligent man.

In 2017, adult star and self-proclaimed bimbo Alicia Amira founded the "Bimbo Movement" in order to reclaim the term and destigmatize hyperfemininity. The term subsequently saw increased usage among members of Generation Z, particularly in the "BimboTok" community on the social media platform TikTok, where users satirized consumerism, capitalism, and misogyny while embracing hyperfemininity. Vice contextualized the bimbo movement as a reaction against girlboss feminism.

In March 2024, the California First Circuit Court of Appeals overturned the lower court's decision to deny a trans woman's request to change her name to Candi Bimbo Doll.

=== Politics ===
In American politics, the word came to prominence in the 1990s during Bill Clinton's sexual misconduct allegations, leading to the invention of the term "bimbo eruptions" to refer to political sex scandals. The expression was also used in a 2014 report in which Colin Powell explained his reluctance to vote for Hillary Clinton in light of her husband's continued affairs with "bimbos".

After the first 2015 Republican presidential debate, Donald Trump re-tweeted a message calling debate moderator and Fox News host Megyn Kelly a "bimbo" via Twitter. Shortly afterwards, Stephen Richter of The Globalist published an opinion piece in which he accused Trump of being a bimbo, noting the original definition of bimbo as "an unintelligent or brutish male".

== Bimbofication ==
Bimbofication denotes the act of transforming someone into a bimbo. In addition to its usage among women reclaiming the mantle of bimbohood, the term often appears in fetish contexts. Bimbofication may involve drastic surgical alterations, such as anatomically improbable breast implants.

In September of 2026, former Homeland Security Secretary and former Governor of South Dakota Kristi Noem filed for divorce against her husband Bryon Noem several months after it was revealed that he had engaged in a bimbofication fetish. Kristi Noem was reportedly "blindsided" and "devastated" when photos of Bryon Noem spread online in March of 2026 with two large balloons under his shirt mimicking extremely large breasts.

== See also ==
- Himbo
- It girl
- Sex and intelligence
- Stereotypes of blondes
