= Expletive =

Expletive may refer to:

- Expletive (linguistics), a word or phrase that is not needed to express the basic meaning of the sentence
- Expletive pronoun, a pronoun used as subject or other verb argument that is meaningless but syntactically required
- Expletive attributive, a word that contributes nothing to meaning but suggests the strength of feeling of the speaker
- Profanity or swear word, a word or expression that is strongly impolite or offensive

== See also ==
- Expletive infixation, morphological process of inserting expletive attributive or profanity into a word
