= Repetition (rhetorical device) =

Poetic device

Repetition is the simple repeating of a word, within a short space of words (including in a poem), with no particular placement of the words to secure emphasis, within a short space of words. It is a multilinguistic written or spoken device, frequently used in English and several other languages, such as Hindi and Chinese, and so rarely termed a figure of speech, making it a multilinguistic written or spoken device. Repetition in some cases is seen as undesirable.

Its forms, many of which are listed below, have varying resonances to listing (forms of enumeration, such as "Firstly, Secondly, Thirdly, Firstly and lastly..."), as a matter of trite logic often similar in effect.

Today, as never before, the fates of men are so intimately linked
to one another that a disaster for one is a disaster for everybody.

— A verse from The Little Virtues, 1962 by Natalia Ginzburg, with repetition of disaster

== Types ==
- Antimetabole is the repetition of words in successive clauses, but in transposed order.

"I know what I like, and I like what I know."

- Tautology is superfluous and simple repetition of the same sense in different words.

"The children gathered in a round circle."

- Antanaclasis is the repetition of a word or phrase to effect a different meaning.

"We must all hang together, or assuredly we shall all hang separately." (Benjamin Franklin)

- Epizeuxis or palilogia is the repetition of a single word or phrase, with no other words in between. This is derived from Greek for "fastening together".

"Words, words, words." (Hamlet)

- Conduplicatio is the repetition of a word in various places throughout a paragraph.

"And the world said, 'Disarm, disclose, or face serious consequences'—and therefore, we worked with the world, we worked to make sure that Saddam Hussein heard the message of the world." (George W. Bush)

- Anadiplosis is the repetition of the last word of a preceding clause. The word is used at the end of a sentence and then used again at the beginning of the next sentence.

"This, it seemed to him, was the end, the end of a world as he had known it..." (James Oliver Curwood)

- Anaphora is the repetition of a word or phrase at the beginning of every clause. It comes from the Greek phrase "carrying up or back".

"We shall fight on the beaches, we shall fight on the landing grounds, we shall fight in the fields and in the streets, we shall fight in the hills. We shall never surrender!" (Winston Churchill)

- Epistrophe is the repetition of a word or phrase at the end of every clause.

"That government of the people, by the people, for the people" (Abraham Lincoln, Gettysburg Address)
"Out of the huts of history’s shame I rise Up from a past that’s rooted in pain I rise" (Maya Angelou, "Still I Rise")

- Mesodiplosis is the repetition of a word or phrase at the middle of every clause.

"We are troubled on every side, yet not distressed; we are perplexed, but not in despair; persecuted, but not forsaken; cast down, but not destroyed..." (Second Epistle to the Corinthians)

- Diaphora is the repetition of a name, first to signify the person or persons it describes, then to signify its meaning. In modern English it has become the standard form of syntax in the example of the personal possessive pronouns given below.

"For your gods are not gods but man-made idols." (The Passion of Saints Sergius and Bacchus)

- Epanalepsis is the repetition of the initial word or words of a clause or sentence at the end.

"The king is dead, long live the king!"

- Diacope is repetition of a word or phrase with one or two words between each repeated phrase.

"Run, Forrest, run" (Forrest Gump)

- Polyptoton is the repetition of a word derived from the same root in different grammatical forms. In inflected languages, this commonly refers to the repetition of a single word in different grammatical cases.

"Diamond me no diamonds, prize me no prizes" (Alfred, Lord Tennyson, Lancelot and Elaine).

== Avoidance of repetition ==
H. W. Fowler and F. G. Fowler adopted the term "elegant variation" in The King's English (1906) referring to the use of synonyms to avoid repetition or to add variety. In their meaning of the term, they focus particularly on instances when the word being avoided is a noun or its pronoun. Pronouns are themselves variations intended to avoid awkward repetition, and variations are so often not necessary, that they should be used only when needed. The Fowlers recommend that "variations should take place only when there is some awkwardness, such as ambiguity or noticeable monotony, in the word avoided".

== See also ==
- Antimetabole
- Double copula
- Chiasmus
- Ploce (figure of speech)
- Reduplication
- Refrain
- Tautophrase
- Sestina, a verse form based on repetition in place of rhyme
