= Minced oaths in media =

Linguistic aspect

It is common to find minced oaths in literature and media. Writers often include minced oaths instead of profanity in their writing to avoid offending their audience or incurring censorship.

== Novels ==
W. Somerset Maugham referred to this problem in his 1919 novel The Moon and Sixpence, where he acknowledged:

Strickland, according to Captain Nichols, did not use exactly the words I have given, but since this book is meant for family reading, I thought it better—at the expense of truth—to put into his mouth language familiar to the domestic circle.

In particular, authors of children's fiction utilize minced oaths for characters who swear profusely, in order to depict a part of their behavior that would be unconvincing not to represent, whilst avoiding the use of swear words considered unsuitable for children.

In 1851, Charles Dickens wrote:

Bark's parts of speech are of an awful sort—principally adjectives. I won't, says Bark, have no adjective police and adjective strangers in my adjective premises! I won't, by adjective and substantive! ... Give me, says Bark, my adjective trousers!

The term dickens itself, most likely from the surname, became a minced oath when referring to the devil.

Flipping, used as a euphemism for fucking, is a slang term first recorded 1911 by DH Lawrence in The White Peacock. A popular combination with heck to make flipping heck, serves as a minced oath of the phrase fucking hell.

Norman Mailer's novel The Naked and the Dead uses "fug" in place of "fuck" throughout.

C.S. Lewis uses buck and bucking throughout That Hideous Strength.

Mystery writer Fran Rizer deploys "kindergarten cussin'" in her Callie Parrish series, where the main character can be heard muttering, "Dalmatian!" and "Shih Tzu!"

In Robert Jordan's The Wheel of Time series, characters use oaths such as "flaming" or "blood and ashes" or the interjection "light" in the same strength as a curse word, without having to print swear words.

Science fiction writer John Brunner, in novels such as The Shockwave Rider and Stand on Zanzibar, uses 'shiv' and 'slit' to refer to male and female body parts (and sometimes males and females) respectively.

The lead characters of Crowley (a demon) and Aziraphale (an angel) from Good Omens, by Terry Pratchett and Neil Gaiman, both use minced oaths on a number of occasions, though for different reasons (Aziraphale genuinely means to avoid offense, while Crowley, being a demon, simply finds it more acceptable to his post to say 'gosh' instead of 'God').

In Stephen King's 2006 novel Lisey's Story, the main characters, Lisey and Scott Landon, use the word smuck instead of fuck, replacing it wherever fuck would be conceivably used: smucking, mothersmucker, smucked up, etc.

In the Gaunt's Ghosts series by Dan Abnett, the Imperial Guardsmen use the word feth as a general all-purpose swear word, primarily to replace the word fuck.

In the series TZA, John Spencer uses spash in place of most curses from the second book forth.

Throughout his comic novel Myron, Gore Vidal replaces various obscenities with the names of judges who were involved in an obscenity trial.

In the Codex Alera series, by Jim Butcher, most obscenities are replaced with a variation of the word crow, e.g. crows or crowbegotten.

Terry Pratchett uses minced oaths for comic effect, for example in Mort: "A wizard. I hate ----ing wizards." "Well, you shouldn't ---- them then," replied the second, effortlessly pronouncing a row of dashes. In a later book, The Truth, the character Mr Tulip habitually and persistently uses a similarly diegetic form of pseudo-profane interjection throughout his dialogue.

In Stephen King's 2009 novel Under the Dome, the character 'Big Jim' Rennie avoids swearing by replacing words such as fucking and clusterfuck with cottonpicking and clustermug.

Ernest Hemingway substituted muck for that with which it rhymes in Across the River and into the Trees and fornicate for that with which it doesn't rhyme in For Whom the Bell Tolls. It makes for some awkward constructions in the latter.

Spider Robinson, in his science fiction novels, consistently uses "kark" in place of "fuck", and "taken slot" in place of "fucking slut" -- "slot" perhaps being also a reference to the female anatomy as receptacle.

Warriors features the minced oaths of "mouse-dung" and rarely "fox-dung," and others relevant to the forest are used in place of curses.

== Comic books ==
In comic series Johnny the Homicidal Maniac, the characters sometimes use the word fook in place of fuck.

The DC Comics character Lobo, an invulnerable, intergalactic bounty hunter uses the term bastich or bastiches as a combination of bastard and bitch. i.e. "Take that you lousy bastiches!"

Captain Haddock, from The Adventures of Tintin, swears unlike a real sailor with sesquipedalian ejaculations like "billions of blistering blue barnacles" and "thundering typhoons".

== Film ==
In the Al Pacino epic Scarface, the title character Tony Montana, played by Pacino, is warned by his Colombian accomplice in the censored version of the film, "Don't fool with me, Tony", and "I warned you not to fool with me, you foolish little monkey". Otherwise, the film, especially in its uncensored version, is filled with use of the word 'fuck', and the censored TV version replaces these in their dozens with 'fool'.

Napoleon Dynamite, in the film of the same name, which is rated PG, uses minced oaths to a particularly comical effect.

In the 1945 war film A Walk in the Sun, the screenplay substitutes "loving" for "fucking" (the universal American soldier's descriptor).

In A Christmas Story, several instances of profanity are replaced with minced gibberish, most prominently in a scene in which the lead character Ralphie suddenly utters a word strongly implied to be "fuck," which he describes as "the Queen Mother of dirty words(.)" Peter Billingsley, who played Ralphie, uttered "fudge" in the film, which the adult Ralphie (author Jean Shepherd) explains in further detail. The censorship was largely the work of Higbee's, who agreed to have its brand featured in the film only if the profanities were removed from the script.

In the 1984 film Johnny Dangerously, the character Roman Maronie is known for butchering the English language, especially English vulgarities:

- You fargin' sneaky bastages! (You fucking sneaky bastards!)
- Don't bullshtein me! (Don't bullshit me!)
- You lousy corksuckers. (You lousy cocksuckers.)
- Dirty summina-batches. (Dirty sons-of-bitches.)
- I'm gonna shove 'em up your icehole. (I'm gonna shove 'em up your asshole.)

One of the more infamous TV edits is that of John McClane's iconic line from Die Hard, "Yippee-ki-yay, motherfucker" is changed to "Yippee-ki-yay, Mr. Falcon".

The TV edit of the film The Usual Suspects, instead of having the police lineup say, "Give me the keys, you fucking cocksucker", they say "Give me the keys, you fairy godmother".

In the 1998 film The Big Lebowski, a well-known television edit exists of one profane-heavy scene altered. "See what happens when you fuck a stranger in the ass" is changed to "See what happens when you find a stranger in the alps" and "this is what happens when you feed a stoner scrambled eggs".

A television edit of the film Repo Man contains the injunction "Flip you, melon farmer!" (Fuck you, motherfucker!)

A censored version of the 2004 film Shaun of the Dead contains a scene where "fuck" and "prick" are changed to "funk" and "prink", respectively. This leads to an exchange of minced oaths beginning, "it's four in the funking morning!" and ending with "it's not hip-hop, it's electro. Prink".

The televised version of the 2006 film Snakes on a Plane received the following edits to two of Samuel L. Jackson's lines: The line "I've had it with these motherfucking snakes on this motherfucking plane" was changed to "I've had it with these monkey-fighting snakes on this Monday-to-Friday plane", and a later use of "fucking" is replaced with "freaking".

== Drama ==
Late Elizabethan drama contains a profusion of minced oaths, probably due to Puritan opposition to swearing. Seven new minced oaths are first recorded between 1598 and 1602, including 'sblood for By God's blood from Shakespeare, 'slight for God's light from Ben Jonson, and 'snails for By God's nails from the historian John Hayward. Swearing on stage was officially banned by the Act to Restraine Abuses of Players in 1606, and a general ban on swearing followed in 1623.

In some cases the original meanings of these minced oaths were forgotten; 'struth (By God's truth) came to be spelled 'strewth and zounds changed pronunciation so that it no longer sounded like By God's wounds. Other examples from this period include 'slid for "By God's eyelid" (1598) and "sfoot" for "By God's foot" (1602). Gadzooks for "by God's hooks" (the nails on Christ's cross) followed in the 1650s, egad for oh God in the late 17th century, and ods bodikins for "by God's little body" in 1709. This is similar to the use popularized in the 1950s of gee whiz as an oath for Jesus' wisdom.

In modern times, the gang members in the musical West Side Story talk in an invented 1950s-style slang that includes several minced oaths. At the end of the "Jet Song," they sing "We're gonna beat / Every last buggin' gang / On the whole buggin' street / On the whole ever-mother-lovin' street!" where buggin and mother-lovin are obvious minced oaths.

== Television ==
"Freaking" (or sometimes "fricking") is often employed on U.S. over-the-air television entertainment programming as an alternative to the adjective "fucking", as in "where's my freaking food?" It is rarely used to replace "fucking" as a term for sexual intercourse.

In the Father Ted episode "The Old Grey Whistle Theft", Ted's picnic at the local picnic area is disturbed by people claiming that he is in their "fupping spot". The man yells out "Fup off, ya grasshole" and when Ted asks them why they are talking like that, the man points to a list of picnic area rules, one of which is "No Swearing". The man finishes by yelling out "Fup off, ya pedrophile." In every single episode of Father Ted no Irish character utters the word "fuck", apart from one scene in "Chirpy Burpy Cheap Sheep" where the phrase "fucking hell" is shouted twice; although its attenuated alternative "feck" is heard repeatedly throughout.

In both incarnations of the television series Battlestar Galactica, characters use the word "frack" (original) or "frak" (re-imagined) in place of "fuck". It occurs as an expletive and in expressions such as "fraks things up good" and "frakking toasters". Characters in the original series also use "felgercarb" in place of "shit". Characters on Veronica Mars then adopted "frak" from Battlestar Galactica.

In the TV series Farscape the characters use the word "frell" as a combination of "frig", "fuck", and "hell" (as in "What the frell is going on?"), and the word "dren" instead of "shit". "Hezmana" and "yotz" are also used as rough replacements for "hell" and "crap" respectively.

In the TV series Firefly, characters often use the word "gorram" in place of "goddam" or "god damned." Further, the word "fuck" and its variants is replaced variously by "hump", "humped" or "rutting". For example, "I would appreciate it if one person on this boat would not assume I'm an evil, lecherous hump," "If they find us at all, we're humped." and "It's the chain I go get and beat you with 'til you understand who's in ruttin' command here." Additionally, the characters do much of their cursing in Mandarin Chinese. This keeps the show unobjectionable enough to air on network television, yet at the same time maintain a realistic level of profanity for a show about outlaws, inspired by the wild west.

Likewise, in Red Dwarf, characters use a series of minced oaths regularly. Two - "Gimboid" and "goit", which are derivations of "gimp" and "git" respectively (although "git" is frequently used also) - have been used occasionally, but the third is a series trademark, "smeg". Although it is said to have derived from "smegma", the show's writers have said it is just a coincidence, as its similarity to the label of an Italian white-goods manufacturer. In any case, it has evolved into a word almost entirely specific to the Red Dwarf universe and numerous alterations were used in the show, such as: "smeg-head", "smeg-for-brains", "smegging", etc.

In South Park the word "fudge" (instead of "fuck") is frequently used, especially in the episode Chef's Chocolate Salty Balls, where Chef sells chocolate fudge delicacies called "Fudge 'Ems", "Fudge This", "Go Fudge Yourself", "I Don't Give a Flying Fudge" and "I Just Went and Fudged Your Momma". "Lover" and "loving" are used in place of "fuck" through the South Park episode "Chickenlover". This is explained in the episode to be for the purpose of protecting young news viewers.

The television series A Bit of Fry and Laurie contains a sketch in which Fry and Laurie employ minced oaths; it is situated in a courthouse, and Laurie plays a policeman reciting the words of an offender. Examples include, "I apprehended the accused and advised him of his rights. He replied "Why don't you ram it up your pim-hole, you fusking cloff prunker."" and "Skank off, you cloffing cuck, you're all a load of shote-bag fuskers, so prunk that up your prime-ministering pim-hole." The sketch ends with Fry asking of Laurie's response to this language, and Laurie proclaiming, "I told him to mind his fucking language, m'lud."

In the Nickelodeon children's show iCarly, characters often use the term "chizz" as a general purpose expletive, most often used in place of 'shit'. iCarly is notorious for its thinly veiled adult humor. Likewise, in the spinoff Sam & Cat, the term "wazz" is used in place of 'piss'.

Characters in the series The Good Place find themselves in an afterlife where they are incapable of using profanity. When they intend to curse, the word instead comes out as a benign minced oath such as "fork" for "fuck", "shirt" for "shit", or "bench" for "bitch".

In the 1970s British sitcom Porridge, Ronnie Barker's character Fletcher regularly used "naff" as a minced oath in the phrase "naff off". This subsequently influenced real-life use of the word: in 1982 Princess Anne was reported to have told paparazzi to "naff off".

Dubbing of movies for television often replaces "Fuck you!" with "Forget you!", "bastard" with "buzzard", "fucking" with "stinking", and "prick" with "pig".

== Music ==
The Fugs, a mid-1960s band named by Tuli Kupferberg, used a euphemism for "fuck" found in Norman Mailer's novel (above), The Naked and the Dead.

== Internet ==
In a discussion of profanity, writer Leigh Lundin uses the glyph ƒ. He further discusses being "nannied" by Internet software, noting that words like cockatoo, pussycat, and even Hummer may be flagged, which has become known as the Scunthorpe problem.

In that vein, ProBoards forums replace the word "cock" with "thingy", thereby transforming the statement "cock his shotgun" into "thingy his shotgun". Similarly, the Something Awful forums, filters replace "fuck" with the phrase "gently caress" and "shit" with "poo-poo" for unregistered users, and the Fark website replaces words such as "fuck" with "fark".

Online, alternative typographical glyphs are sometimes used to evade profanity filters (such as $hit or $#!+ instead of shit, @$$ or @rse instead of ass or arse).

"fsck", from "filesystem check", is commonly used on Usenet and in other technology-related circles to replace "fuck".

== See also ==
- Minced oath
- Blasphemy
- Bowdlerization
- Euphemism
- Expletive deleted
- Four letter word
- Fuddle duddle
- Profanity
- Scunthorpe problem
