= Sakes alive =

Exclamation

"Sakes alive!" is an old-fashioned minced oath, popular in the 1930s through 1950s and recorded as early as the 1860s. It derives from "Lord's sakes (alive)", equivalent to today's “my goodness”, “good Lord”, “oh my God” or "for God's sake".

Variants include "snakes alive!" and "saints alive!".
