= Ploce =

Ploce may refer to:

- Ploce (figure of speech)
- Ploče, a city in Croatia
