= Ploce (figure of speech) =

Rhetorical device

A ploce (/ˈplɒsi/) is a figure of speech in which a word is repeated, with separation between them, in which the second iteration possess a different meaning, significance, or emphasis. Ploce is also sometimes spelled as ploche or ploke and may be referred to as conduplicatio, conexio, copulatio, diaphora, doubler, epanados, swift repeate, traductio.

== Definition ==
Ploce has been defined in several ways according to different sources; the following are some given definitions:

- A repetition of a word in which the initial definition is more particular and then generalized
- A polyptoton, or a word repeated with different inflections
- A diacope, or a word repeated with a small separation
- A repetition of a proper name
- An epizeuxis, or general repetition of a single word

Ploce can also be conflated with antanaclasis, a type of pun, which a similar definition (in which a word is repeated in two different senses), but they are often kept separate.

== Examples ==
- "I am that I am" — Exodus 3:14
- "Make war upon themselves— brother to brother / Blood to blood, self against self" — Richard III, by Shakespeare
- "My lovely one I fain would love thee much, but all my Love is none at all I see" — Edward Taylor, "Preparatory Meditation 12"
- Hope is the feeling we have that the feeling we have is not permanent — Mignon McLaughlin, The Neurotic's Notebook
- "I know what's going on. I may be from Ohio, but I'm not from Ohio" — Daisy, Bowfinger
- "Victor Hugo was a madman who thought he was Victor Hugo" — Jean Cocteau
- "The way to stop discrimination on the basis of race is to stop discriminating on the basis of race" — John Roberts, 2007

== See also ==
- Repetition (rhetorical device)
- Epizeuxis
- Diacope
- Polyptoton
- Antanaclasis
