= Zero copula =

Lacking or omission of a "to be" verb, common in some languages and stylistic in others

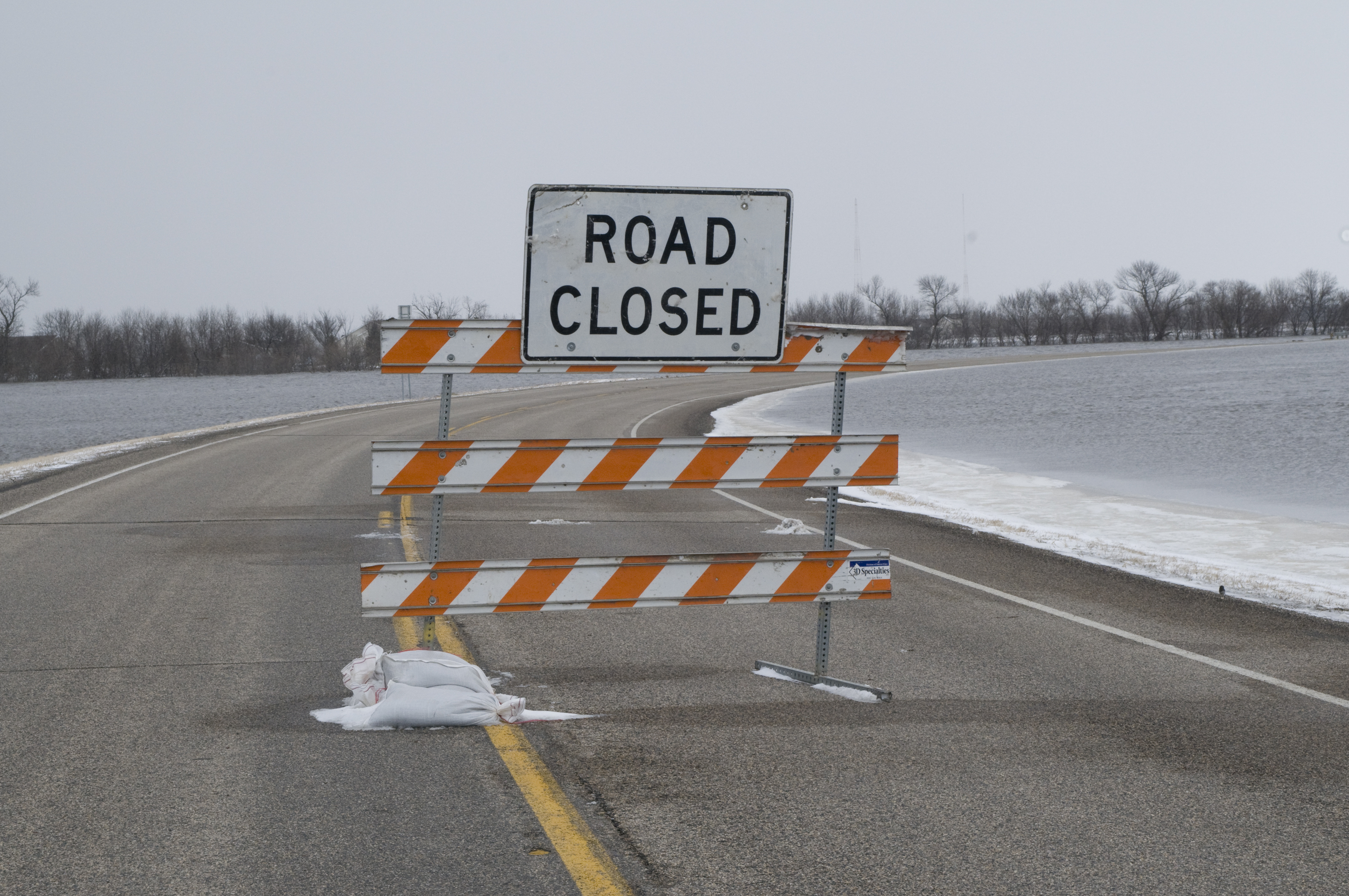
Road signs commonly use zero copula (omitting the verb to be). This sign uses the sentence "road closed" as a nominal sentence to mean "the road is closed."

Zero copula, also known as null copula, is a linguistic phenomenon whereby the subject is joined to the predicate without overt marking of this relationship (like the copula to be in English). One can distinguish languages that simply do not have a copula and languages that have a copula that is optional in certain contexts.

Dropping the copula is also found, to a lesser extent, in English and many other languages, used most frequently in rhetoric, casual speech, non-standard varieties, road signs, and headlinese, the writing style used in newspaper headlines. Sometimes, these omissions cause unintended syntactic ambiguity.

== In English ==
Standard English exhibits a few limited forms of the zero copula. One is found in comparative correlatives like "the bigger, the better" and "the more the merrier". However, no known natural language lacks this structure, and it is not clear how a comparative is joined with its correlate in this kind of copula. Zero copula also appears in casual questions and statements like "you from out of town?" and "enough already!" where the verb (and more) may be omitted due to ellipsis. It can also be found, in a slightly different and more regular form, in the headlines of English newspapers, where short words and articles are generally omitted to conserve space. For example, a headline would more likely say "Parliament at a standstill" than "Parliament is at a standstill". Because headlines are generally simple, in "A is B" statements, an explicit copula is rarely necessary.

Zero copulae are very common in sports announcing. For example: "Johnson already with two hits today." "Unitas with a lot of time."

The zero copula is far more common in some varieties of Caribbean creoles and African American Vernacular English, where phrases like "Where you at?" and "Who she?" can occur. As in Russian and Arabic, where the copula can only be omitted in the present tense, the copula can only be omitted in African American Vernacular English when it can be contracted in Standard American English.

== In other languages ==
Omission frequently depends on the tense and use of the copula.

=== Bengali ===
In Bengali (Bangla) zero copula is usually found in the present tense when describing the state or adjectival properties of a subject, when alongside a prepositional phrase, or with the adverb 'here' or 'there'. For example, in the sentence,

- আমরা এখানে (aamra ekhane, "We are here", literally "We (at) here"),

the copula আছি (aachhi, "are/exist", first person conjugation) is omitted, and in

- আমার নাম ফাতিমা (amar nam fatima, "My name is Fatima", literally "My name Fatima"),

the possessive noun phrase and the name are always placed together.

=== Russian ===
In Russian the copula бы́ть (byt’) is normally omitted in the present tense, but not in the past and future tenses:

Present (omitted):

- Она́ до́ма (Ona doma, literally "She at home"), i.e., "She is now at home, in the house"

Past (used):

- Она́ была́ до́ма (Ona byla doma, "She was at home")

When equating two nouns, a dash is normally used to separate the terms in writing (and a short pause in speaking):

- Слон — млекопита́ющее (Slon — mlekopitayushcheye, "An elephant is a mammal")

The third person plural су́ть (sut’, "are") is still used in some standard phrases, but since it is a homonym of the noun "essence", most native speakers do not notice it to be a verb:

- Они́ су́ть одно́ и то́ же (Oni sut’ odno i to zhe, "they are one and the same").

The verb бы́ть (byt’) is the infinitive of "to be". The third person singular, есть (yest’), means "is". As a copula, it can be inflected into the past (бы́л, byl), "future" (бу́дет, budet), and conditional (бы́л бы, byl by) forms. A present tense (есть, yest’) exists; however, it is almost never used as a copula, but rather omitted altogether or replaced by the verb явля́ться (yavlyat'sa, "to be in essence"). Thus one can say:

- Она́ бы́ла краса́вицей (Ona byla krasavitsej, "she was a beautiful woman")—predicate noun in instrumental case.
- Она краса́вица (Ona krasavitsa, "she is a beautiful woman")—predicate noun in the nominative case.
- Она явля́ется краса́вицей (Ona yavlyayetsya krasavitsej, "she is a beautiful woman")—predicate noun also in instrumental.

But not usually:

- Она́ есть краса́вица (Ona yest’ krasavitsa, "she is a beautiful woman"), which would be very formal and would suggest something more than a copula, something more existential than the normal English use of "is". As a result, this construction is quite rare.

But in some cases the verb бы́ть in the present tense (form есть) is employed: Бу́дь тем, кто ты есть (Be who you are).

The present tense of the copula in Russian was in common use well into the 19th century (as attested in the works of Fyodor Dostoyevsky) but is now used only for archaic effect (analogous to "thou art" in English).

=== Turkic languages ===
There is a contrast between the regular verb "to be" (olmak) and the copulative/auxiliary verb "to be" (imek) in Turkish.

The auxiliary verb imek shows its existence only through suffixes to predicates that can be nouns, adjectives or arguably conjugated verb stems, arguably being the only irregular verb in Turkish. In the third person, zero copula is the rule, as in Hungarian or Russian. For example:

Deniz mavi.	"[The] sea [is] blue."	(an example of zero copula);
Ben maviyim.	"I am blue."	(the auxiliary verb i-mek appears in (y)im.)

The essential copula is possible in the third person singular:

Deniz mavidir.	"[The] sea is (always, characteristically) blue."

In Tatar, dir expresses doubt rather than a characteristic. The origin of dir is the verb durmak, with a similar meaning to the Latin stare.

In the modern Tatar language copula is a disappearing grammatical phenomenon and is only rarely used with the first and second person (while the third person copula has fallen completely out of use). In the past there was a full paradigm for all persons:

	Singular	Plural
I person	-мын/-мен	-быз/-без
II person	-сың/-сең	-сыз/-сез
III person	-дыр/-дер (-тыр/тер)	-дыр/-дер (-тыр/тер)

For example: Мин укытучымын (Min ukıtuçımın, "I'm a teacher"), Син укытучысың (Sin ukıtuçısıñ, "You're a teacher"), Ул укытучыдыр (Ul ukıtuçıdır, "He/She's a teacher"). While the copulas for the first and second person are historically derived from personal pronouns, the third person copula comes from the verb тор (tor, "stand, live, exist"). For negation the copula affix is attached to the negative particle түгел (tügel): Мин язучы түгелмен (Min yazuçı tügelmen, "I'm not a writer"). The copula is only used with nouns. Sometimes the noun can be in the locative case: Сез өйдәсез (Sez öydäsez, "You (plural) are at home").

=== Japanese ===
In Japanese, the copula is not used with predicative adjectives, such as gohan wa atsui(desu) (ご飯は熱い（です）; [the] food [is] hot). It is sometimes omitted with predicative nouns and adjectival nouns in non-past tense, such as keitai-denwa wa benri (携帯電話は便利[だ]（です）; mobile phones [are] convenient), but is necessary for marking past tense or negation, as in ii keiken datta(ii keiken deshita) (いい経験だった（いい経験でした）; [it] was [a] good experience). It is also sometimes omitted in wh-questions, such as nani kore? (Kore wa nan desuka?) (何これ？（これは何ですか？）; what [is] this?).

=== Māori ===
In Māori, the zero copula can be used in predicative expressions and with continuous verbs (many of which take a copulative verb in many Indo-European languages) — He nui te whare, literally "a big the house", "the house (is) big"; I te tēpu te pukapuka, literally "at (past locative particle) the table the book", "the book (was) on the table"; Nō Ingarangi ia, literally "from England (s)he", "(s)he (is) from England"; Kei te kai au, literally "at the (act of) eating I", "I (am) eating"

=== Arabic ===
In Arabic, a Semitic language, the use of the zero copula again depends on the context. In the present tense affirmative, when the subject is definite and the predicate is indefinite, the subject is simply juxtaposed with its predicate. When both the subject and the predicate are definite, a pronoun (agreeing with the subject) may be inserted between the two. For example:

- محمد مهندس (Muḥammad muhandis), "Muhammad is an engineer" (lit. "Muhammad an-engineer")
- محمد هو المهندس (Muḥammad huwa l-muhandis), "Muhammad is the engineer" (lit. "Muhammad he the-engineer")

The extra pronoun is highly recommended in order for one not to confuse the predicate for a qualifying adjective:

- محمد المهندس (Muḥammad al-muhandis), "Muhammad the engineer"

(This is just a noun phrase with no copula. See al- for more on the use of definite and indefinite nouns in Arabic and how it affects the copula.)

In the past tense, however, or in the present tense negative, the verbs kāna and laysa are used, which take the accusative case:

- كان محمد مهندسًا (Kāna Muḥammad muhandisan), "Muhammad was an engineer" (kāna = "(he) was") (literally "be it Muhammad an-engineer")
- محمد ليس مهندسًا (Muḥammad laysa muhandisan), "Muhammad is not an engineer" (lit. "Muhammad is not an-engineer")

When the copula is expressed with a verb, no pronoun need be inserted, regardless of the definiteness of the predicate:

- محمد ليس بالمهندس (Muḥammad laysa bi-l-muhandis), "Muhammad is not the engineer" (lit. "Muhammad is not of the-engineer")

Hebrew, another Semitic language, uses zero copula in a very similar way.

=== Ganda ===
The Ganda verb "to be", -li, is used in only two cases: when the predicate is a prepositional phrase and when the subject is a pronoun and the predicate is an adjective:

- Ali mulungi, "She is beautiful" (ali, "(he/she) is")
- Kintu ali mu mmotoka, "Kintu is in the car" (literally "Kintu he-is in-car")

Otherwise, the zero copula is used:

- Omuwala mulungi, "The girl is beautiful" (literally "the-girl beautiful")

Here the word mulungi, "beautiful" is missing its initial vowel pre-prefix o-. If included, it would make the adjective qualify the noun omuwala attributively:

- Omuwala omulungi, "The beautiful girl" or "a beautiful girl".

=== American Sign Language ===
American Sign Language does not have a copula. For example, "my hair is wet" is signed my hair wet, and "my name is Pete" may be signed [MY NAME]^{topic} P-E-T-E.

=== Irish ===
The copula is is used in Irish but may be omitted in the present tense. For example, Is fear mór é ("He is a big man") can be expressed as simply Fear mór é. The common phrase Pé scéal é (meaning "anyhow", lit. "Whatever story it [is]") also omits the copula.

=== Welsh ===
Since Welsh often requires the use of a predicative particle to denote non-definite predicate, the copula can be omitted in certain phrases. For example, the phrase Ac yntau'n ddyn byr... ("Since he is/was/etc. a short man...") literally translates as "And he [particle] a short man...". The zero copula is especially common in Welsh poetry of the gogynfardd style.

=== Native American languages ===
Nahuatl, as well as some other Native American languages, has no copula. Instead of using a copula, it is possible to conjugate nouns or adjectives like verbs.

Grammarians and other comparative linguists, however, do not consider this to constitute a zero copula but rather an affixal copula. Affixal copulae are not unique to Native American languages but can be found, for instance, in Korean and in the Inuit languages.

Many indigenous languages of South America do, however, have true zero copulae in which no overt free or bound morpheme is present when one noun is equated with another. In fact, zero-copula is likely to occur in third-person contexts in Southern Quechua (notice wasiqa hatunmi 'the house is big' vs. wasiqa hatunmi kan 'the house is big', where kan, the Quechua copula, is not really needed, as suggested by the first sentence).

Yaghan, from Tierra del Fuego, used, in its heyday back in the mid-19th century, zero copula as one option, when introducing new participants in discourse, but had a slew of posture-based copular verbs for all other contexts. So I could say, kvnji-u:a Jon (lit. 'this man IS John'(zero copula). kvnji 'this', u:a 'man' (v here is schwa, and colon marks tenseness of the vowel preceding it), but once John has been introduced I might say, Jon lvpatvx-wvshta:gu:a mu:ta 'John is a woodworker', lvpatvx 'wood' (x voiceless velar fricative), wvshta:gu: 'work' u:a 'man', mu:ta irregular present tense form of mu:tu: 'to be (sitting) (or occupied doing)'

=== Chinese ===
Modern Standard Chinese, as well as many other Chinese dialects, uses a copula, such as the Mandarin word shì (是), before nouns in predications, like in Wŏ shì Zhōngguó rén (我是中国人 / I am Chinese), but not usually before verbs or adjectives. For example, saying Wǒ shì kāixīn (我是开心 / I am happy) is a grammatically incorrect sentence, but saying Wǒ kāixīn (我开心 / I happy), is correct. Adverbs can be added to the adjective, like in Wǒ hĕn kāixīn (我很开心 / I very happy). A copula may be used for adjectives, however, if the particle de (的) is added after the adjective, like in Wǒ shì kāixīn de (我是开心的).

=== Vietnamese ===
Somewhat similar to Chinese, the Vietnamese language requires the copula là before nouns in predications but does not use a copula before verbs or adjectives, thus Tôi là sinh viên (I am a student) but Tôi giỏi (I [am] smart). The topic marker thì may appear before an adjective to emphasize the subject, for example Tôi thì giỏi (As for me, I am smart). Many prepositions in Vietnamese originated as verbs and continue to function as verbs in sentences that would use a copula in English. For example, in Tôi ở nhà (I am at home), the word ở may be analyzed as either "to be at" or simply "at". Sometimes, attributive adjectives may follow the verb có (to have), thus Tôi (có) cao is a feasible sentence.

== See also ==
- E-Prime – Restricted form of the English language
- Zero (linguistics) – Absence in linguistics
- Turkish copula – Use of copulas in the Turkish language
- Zero copula in Hungarian – Verbs of the Hungarian language
- Double copula – Reduplication of "is" (to be) copula verbs used in some styles of English
- Pro-drop language – Language in which certain pronouns may sometimes be omitted

== Literature ==
- Wolfram, Walter (1969) A Sociolinguistic Description of Detroit Negro Speech. Washington, DC: Center for Applied Linguistics p. 165–179
