= Profanity in science fiction =

Profanity in science fiction shares all of the issues of profanity in fiction in general, but has several unique aspects of its own, including the use of alien profanities (such as the alien expletive "shazbot!" from Mork & Mindy, a word that briefly enjoyed popular usage outside of that television show).

== Extent of usage ==
In his advice to other SF writers, Orson Scott Card states that there are no hard-and-fast rules for the use of profanity in SF stories, despite what may have been expected of writers in the past. The onus is squarely on the writer to determine how much profanity to use, to enquire as to each publisher's limits, and to think about the effect that the use of profanity will have on the reader, both in perceiving the characters and in possibly being offended by the story as a whole.

Card urges those writers who do decide to omit profanity from their stories to omit it completely. He regards the coinage of tanj ("There Ain't No Justice") by Larry Niven as a "noble experiment" that "proved that euphemisms are often worse than the crudities that they replace", because they make the story look silly. In Card's opinion, such nonce words simply do not work.

Ruth Wajnryb shares this opinion, stating that tanj or flarn do not work as profanities because they are not real, and are "just a futile attempt to give clean-cut stories some foul-mouthed action".

Jes Battis observes, in contrast, that the use of frell and dren in Farscape allowed the television series to get away with dialogue that would normally never have made it past broadcasting and network censorship. The words are respectively equivalent to fuck and shit and are used as both interjections and nouns in the series. In the episode "Suns and Lovers", for example, Aeryn Sun says "frell me dead!" as an exclamation of surprise, much as a real-world person would utter "well, fuck me!"^{[frell]} or, indeed, "fuck me dead!" Battis also notes that Firefly used a similar strategy, by using Mandarin Chinese and Cantonese for all profanities, also using the word gorram as a replacement for god damn, a phrase usually considered blasphemous. Likewise, dialogue in Battlestar Galactica is liberally peppered with the word frak ('fuck').

Similarly, invented expletives are used throughout the Star Wars expanded universe. For example, the Alderaanian expletive stang was introduced in the 1978 novel Splinter of the Mind's Eye and subsequently used in Star Wars novels, comic books, and games. Star Wars authors commonly use the Huttese curse fierfek (described in-universe as being an alien loan-word originally meaning 'poison'), first introduced in a short story published in the 1996 anthology Tales from Jabba's Palace, and the Corellian curse sithspawn, first introduced in the 1994/1995 comic book series Dark Empire II. Invented profanity was used through the 2005 video game Star Wars: Republic Commando by the game's special forces protagonists to make the illusion of playing as commandos more believable. In addition to fierfek, Republic Commando introduced the pejorative clanker as a slur to refer to battle droids. Clanker entered widespread use in 2025 to express hatred or distaste towards artificial intelligence.

Parke Godwin opines that excessive profanity, as a part of naturalistic dialogue, "dulls much modern fiction and too many films" and states it to be a pitfall for novice writers, or for writers who never grow up, to fall into. He states that it is a "lazy copout that no longer frightens horses in the street, merely annoys and ultimately bores an intelligent reader". He advises writers that "less is more", and that if it really is the right thing for a character to be "salty", it should be made clear to the reader why, observing as an example that in his science fiction novel Limbo Search the profanity used by character Janice Tyne is a symptom of her fear and tension, caused by being burned out at age 27 and afraid of the future.

Wanda Raiford observes that the use of the nonce word frak in both Battlestar Galactica series is "an indispensable part of the naturalistic tone that show strives to achieve", noting that it, and toaster (a racial epithet for Cylons), allow the show to use obscene and racialist dialogue that no real-life educated American adult would consider using the real-life equivalents of in polite company. She compares the racial hatred associated with the use of nigger (an utterance of which she states to have preceded and accompanied "every lynching of a black person in America") to the racial hatred of the Cylons, by the humans, that the use of such phrases as frakking toasters indicates in the series. She also observes that several of the characters, including Gaius Baltar, are frakking toaster lovers.

In the series of Star Trek: New Frontier novels by Peter David, the principal protagonist, Captain Mackenzie Calhoun, frequently utters the word grozit, a curse from his home world of Xenex. It is understood to be the equivalent to shit.

== Fictional profanities ==
Profanity in SF also encompasses the idea of things that alien cultures might find profane, and the notion that what non-humans and humans find to be profane may differ markedly. Card observes that human profanity encompasses words dealing with sexual intercourse and states that that tells one something about human beings. He proceeds to suggest that what aliens might find to be profane can be a useful tool for suggesting the alienness of a culture. The first example of this that he gives are alien cultures that have no trouble with words about sexual intercourse, but that find words to do with eating to be profane. Star Trek: Enterprise made use of this concept in the episode "Vox Sola". The second example Card provides is that of alien cultures where the idea of property ownership is considered to be as obscene as pederasty. Douglas Adams's The Hitchhiker's Guide to the Galaxy at one point mentions that the word Belgium is the worst profanity in the galaxy.

== In other contexts ==
As mentioned above, shazbot briefly enjoyed popular usage outside of its television show. Battlestar Galactica's frak, a word that Lee Goldberg characterized as "something truly amazing and subversive" and that Scott Adams called "pure genius", has also escaped its original context. Originally spelled frack, it along with felgercarb were coined by writer Glen A. Larson for the 1978 Battlestar Galactica, for much the same reasons that frell and dren were coined for Farscape: the ability to use profane dialogue, with words that would be immediately understood as synonymous with the real profanities that they stood in for, without falling foul of network censorship and broadcasting restrictions accompanying its original Sunday evening broadcast timeslot.

The producers re-spelled the word frak for the 2004 Battlestar Galactica series, in order to make it, literally, a four-letter word; the word appears in several Black Library novels before then, most notably the Ciaphas Cain series. It has escaped, in both forms, from the series to a whole variety of other contexts, from a Dilbert cartoon strip where Dilbert mutters it, through other television shows including The Office, Gossip Girl, Veronica Mars, 30 Rock, The Big Bang Theory, and Scrubs, and Robert Crais's Elvis Cole novel Chasing Darkness, to everyday spoken use.

The BBC Two science fiction television series Red Dwarf replaces most of its characters' profanities with invented terms, mainly smeg (possibly a truncation of smegma) and its compound smeg-head. Other common insults are goit and gimboid.

The 2016 comedic TV series The Good Place introduces multiple euphemistic wordplays on the real-world profanities. Since the show is set in the afterlife-analogue of heaven, the people cannot directly curse there and any swear word is automatically being replaced with a similarly pronounced English word, whenever a person is trying to say it. Some of the most notable substitutions are: fuck → fork, shit → shirt, bitch → bench, asshole → ashhole, and the derivatives motherfucker → motherforker and bullshit → bullshirt. Such automatic replacement was also compared with the real-world iPhone's autocorrect feature.

== Footnotes ==
- ^frell Battis has lot to say on Aeryn Sun's use of "frell" here, in terms of its status as a non-performative utterance, and the locutionary and perlocutionary power of the statement. For more detail, see pages 146 et seq. of Battis 2007.

== See also ==
- Minced oaths in literature
