= Expletive deleted =

Censored or redacted profanity

The phrase expletive deleted indicates that profanity has been censored from a text by the author or by a subsequent censor, usually appearing in place of the profanity.

== History ==
The phrase has been used for this purpose since at least the 1930s, but became more widely used in the United States after the Watergate scandal. Compelled by a subpoena to provide the contents of the White House taping system to the House Judiciary Committee in April 1974, President Richard Nixon ordered transcripts of the tapes to be prepared. After a cursory inspection of the transcripts, Nixon, shocked at viewing several profanity-laced discussions amongst the White House's inner-circle, ordered that every use of profanity be replaced by "[EXPLETIVE DELETED]".

The transcripts were published in The New York Times and elicited shock in much of the country, given Nixon's generally staid public image and the fact that contemporary media coverage of politicians did not usually report candidates' profanity use. As Nixon biographer Jonathan Aitken noted, Nixon had a rather broad view on what constituted profanity, and had ordered comparatively minor outbursts like Christ and hell to be replaced as expletives. Seeing the jarring phrase repeatedly within the transcripts seemed to give the public the impression that the words used were far harsher than what actually appeared on the tapes.

The phrase entered the public imagination to the point where protesters outside the White House held up picket signs reading, "IMPEACH THE (EXPLETIVE DELETED)!"

In later years, the phrase became commonplace as an ironic expression which indicates that a profanity has been omitted; this catchphrase has passed into general usage as a convenient linguistic figleaf.

== Technical definition of expletive ==
The phrase expletive deleted indicates that profanity has been censored from a text by the author or by a subsequent censor, usually appearing in place of the profanity. The term expletive is commonly used to refer to any bad language (or profanity), used with or without meaning. Expletives in this wide sense may be adjectives, adverbs, nouns, (most commonly), interjections, or (rarely) verbs.

Within linguistics, however, "expletive" is a technical term referring to a word that does not contribute semantically to the meaning of a sentence, such as an expletive attributive or a dummy pronoun. An expletive in this technical sense is not necessarily rude.

== See also ==
- Minced oath
