= Infix =

Affix inserted inside a word stem

An infix is an affix inserted inside a word stem (an existing word or the core of a family of words). It contrasts with adfix, a rare term for an affix attached to the outside of a stem, such as a prefix or suffix. (Note: In mathematics, the terms prefix (Polish notation) and postfix (reverse Polish notation) are used.)

When marking text for interlinear glossing, most affixes are separated with a hyphen, but infixes are separated with ⟨angle brackets⟩.

== English ==
English has almost no true infixes and those it does have are marginal. Most are heard in colloquial speech; although there are other examples, such as in technical terminology, these examples are often more accurately described as tmesis.

=== Colloquialisms ===
None of the following are recognized in standard English.

- The infix ⟨-iz-⟩ or ⟨-izn-⟩ is characteristic of hip-hop slang, for example h-iz-ouse for house and sh-izn-it for shit.
- The ⟨-ma-⟩ infix (or "Homeric infix," after Homer Simpson), gives a word an ironic pseudo-sophistication, as in sophisti-ma-cated (sophisticated), saxo-ma-phone, (saxophone) and edu-ma-cation. (education) This exists as a slang phenomenon.
- Infixes also occur in some language games.
- The use of 'expletive infixes' such as -fucking- and -bloody-, which are words rather than affixes, is known as tmesis.

== Indo-European nasal infix ==
The present tense of some Proto-Indo-European verbs, in the case of a certain number of roots, adds a nasal infix (m, n) to the basic root. The stems of the other tenses have the root without the infix, and thus these verbs are called nasal-presents. This phenomenon is inherited, and preserved to varying degrees, by some early daughter languages such as Sanskrit, Ancient Greek, Latin language, etc.

- Sanskrit exhibits the greatest transparency of this feature amongst the Indo-European languages, with the phenomenon manifesting in three of the ten traditional verb classes, where the infix is higher-grade and accent-bearing in the strong forms, and reduced-grade in the weak forms. For example, √yuj-, 'join' has yu·ná·k·ti 's/he joins' ↔ yu·ñj·ánti, 'they join'.
- Latin present vincō "I win" (cf. perfect passive participle victus "conquered")
- Ancient Greek lambánō (also with -an- suffix) "I take" (cf. aorist élǎbon "I took")

== Spanish ==
In Nicaraguan, Costa Rican, and Honduran Spanish, the Spanish diminutive affix becomes an infix ⟨it⟩ in names: Óscar [ˈoskar] → Osquítar [osˈkitar] (cf. standard Oscarito); Edgar → Edguítar; Victor → Victítor. This diminutive infix can also be found for the word azúcar, due to its unusual form as a paroxytone word with a final /r/, giving azuquítar.

== Portuguese ==
In Portuguese, some pronominal verbal forms have infixes, like dir-lhe-ei "(I) will tell him" where lhe is the "him" pronoun. Most seen in the conditional mode and the future indicative, it is not very common.

== Arabic ==
Arabic uses a common infix, ⟨t⟩ ت for Form VIII verbs, usually a reflexive of Form I. It is placed after the first consonant of the root; an epenthetic i- prefix is also added, since words cannot begin with a consonant cluster. An example is اجتهد ijtahada "he worked hard", from جهد jahada "he strove". (The words ijtihad and jihad are nouns derived from these two verbs.)

== Austronesian and Austroasiatic languages ==
Infixes are common in some Austronesian and Austroasiatic languages, but not in others. For example, in Tagalog, a grammatical form similar to the active voice is formed by adding the infix ⟨um⟩ near the beginning of a verb. The most common infix is ⟨in⟩, which marks the perfect aspect, as in 'giniba', meaning 'ruined' (from 'giba', an adjective meaning 'worn-out'); 'binato', meaning 'stoned' (from 'bato', 'stone'); and 'ginamit', meaning 'used'. Tagalog has borrowed the English word graduate as a verb; to say "I graduated," a speaker uses the derived form grumaduate.

Khmer, an Austroasiatic language, has seven different infixes. They include the nominalizing infix ⟨b⟩, which derives lbɨən 'speed' from lɨən 'fast' and lbɑɑng ' trial' from lɔɔng 'to test, to haunt', or the agentive ⟨m⟩ deriving cmam 'watchman' from cam 'to watch'. The majority (but not all) of these elements are no longer productive and occur crystallized in words inherited from Old Khmer.

In Malay and Indonesian, there are three infixes (sisipan), ⟨el⟩, ⟨em⟩, and ⟨er⟩. All infixes are no longer productive and cannot be used to derive new words. Examples include:

- The word gembung (variant of kembung) means 'bloated', while gelembung means 'bubble'.
- The word cerlang means 'luminous', while cemerlang means 'brilliant'.
- The word gigi means 'tooth', while gerigi means 'serration'.

== Seri ==
In Seri, some verbs form the plural stem with infixation of ⟨tóo⟩ after the first vowel of the root; compare the singular stem ic 'plant (verb)' with the plural stem itóoc. Examples: itíc 'did s/he plant it?' and ititóoc 'did they sow it?'.

== Similar processes ==
Tmesis, which uses a lexical word rather than an affix, is sometimes considered a type of infixation. These are the so-called "expletive infixes", as in abso-bloody-lutely. Since these are not affixes, they are commonly disqualified from being considered infixes.

Sequences of adfixes (prefixes or suffixes) do not result in infixes: an infix must be internal to a word stem. Thus, the word originally, formed by adding the suffix -ly to original, does not turn the suffix -al into an infix. There is simply a sequence of two suffixes, origin-al-ly. In order for -al- to be considered an infix, it would have to have been inserted in the non-existent word *originly. The "infixes" in the tradition of Bantu linguistics are often sequences of prefixes of this type, though there may be debate over specific cases.

The Semitic languages have a form of ablaut (changing the vowels within words, as in English sing, sang, sung, song) that is sometimes called infixation, as the vowels are placed between the consonants of the root. However, this interdigitation of a discontinuous root with a discontinuous affix is more often called transfixation.

An interfix joins a compound word, as in speed-o-meter.

== Glossing ==
When glossing, it is conventional to set off infixes with ⟨angle brackets⟩, rather than the hyphens used to set off prefixes and suffixes:

sh⟨izn⟩it, saxo⟨ma⟩phone, pi⟨pe⟩coline

Compare:

origin-al-ly

which contains the suffix -ly added to the word original, which is itself formed by adding the suffix -al to the root origin.

== See also ==
- Circumfix
- Clitic
- Expletive infixation
- Tree traversal

== Bibliography ==
- Fortson, Benjamin W (2010). Indo-European Language and Culture. Wiley-Blackwell. ISBN 978-1-4051-8895-1.
- Szemerényi, Oswald JL (1996). Introduction to Indo-European Linguistics. Great Britain: Clarendon Oxford. ISBN 0-19-824015-5.
- Burrow, T (2001). The Sanskrit Language. Motilal Banarsidass. ISBN 81-208-1767-2.
- Yu, Alan C. L. (2004). "Reduplication In English Homeric Infixation". Proceedings of the North East Linguistic Society. University of Massachusetts.
