= Expletive attributive =

Part of speech, adverbial or adjectival intensifier

An expletive attributive is an adjective or adverb (or adjectival or adverbial phrase) that does not contribute to the meaning of a sentence, but is used to intensify its emotional force. Often such words or phrases are regarded as profanity or "bad language", though there are also inoffensive expletive attributives. The word is derived from the Latin verb explere, meaning "to fill", and it was originally introduced into English in the 17th century for various kinds of padding.

== Etymology ==
Expletive comes from the Latin verb explere, meaning "to fill", via expletivus, "filling out". It was introduced into English in the 17th century for various kinds of padding—the padding out of a book with peripheral material, the addition of syllables to a line of poetry for metrical purposes, and so forth. The use of expletive for such a meaning is now rare. Rather, expletive is a linguistics term for a meaningless word filling a syntactic vacancy. Outside linguistics, the word is commonly used to refer to "bad language" or profanity. Some linguists use it as shorthand for "expletive attributive".

== Usage ==
There are many attributive adjectives and adverbs in English that function to indicate a speaker's anger, irritation or (in some cases) strong approval without otherwise modifying the meaning of the phrase in which they occur. An example is the word bloody as used in the following sentences:

- "You'd better pray for a bloody miracle if you want to avoid bankruptcy."
- "That was a bloody good meal."
- "You'd better bloody well make it happen!"

An expletive attributive is a type of intensifier. Unlike other adjective or adverb usage, bloody or bloody well in these sentences do not modify the meaning of miracle, good meal, or make it happen. The expletive attributives here suggest that the speaker feels strongly about the proposition being expressed. Other vulgar words may also be used in this way:

- "The goddamn policeman tailed me all the goddamn way home."
- "I fucking hope he fucking chokes on his motherfucking peanuts."

Words that are never thought of as offensive can be used in similar ways. For example:

- "I forgot to pay the phone bill twice running, so the wretched line was cut off."

The phone line discussed may have, before it was cut off, been just as good as any other, so would not have been wretched in the literal senses of "extremely shoddy", "devoid of hope" or similar. Rather, wretched serves here as a politer equivalent of expletive bloody and the like.

== Infixation and interposition ==
Besides usual positioning for adverbs and attributive adjectives, expletive attributives can be found in unusual positions where others rarely are (including other intensifiers). Although considered colloquial at best, they are inserted:

- inside morphemes
- between bases and affixes
- inside compounds
- inside letter and numeral words
- inside names
- between an adverb, negative or intensifier and an adjective
- between an adjectival or determiner and a noun
- between a preposition and a noun
- between a verb and a particle or adverb
- between an auxiliary and a verb
- preceding the post-modifier else
- inside idioms
- between a wh- form and a predicate

Depending on the precise definition (and the grammarian's general approach), these insertions may be classed as infixation, (Note: Infixation is rare in the English language.) tmesis, diacope, interposition or unrecognized.

== See also ==
- Affect (linguistics)
