= Gaali free India =

Indian social campaign against profanity

Gaali Free India (transl. abuse-free India) is a social campaign against profanity and the use of abusive words. It started in 2016 with a motive to raise awareness among youth who are unable to control their feelings and find refuge in profanity to vent their feelings and frustration. Claimed to be inspired by Swachh Bharat cleanliness campaign, the Gaali free India campaign aims to build awareness for an abuse-free language culture. The campaign, being driven by a creative professional, uses online graphics and videos on digital platforms to drive awareness against profanity in spoken and online interactions and digital media. It highlights the adverse impact of abusive language, especially on women and children. The Gaali Free India campaign seeks to stand up for the objectification and sexualization of women.

In 2016, it was recognized as one of the three most influential social campaigns. In June 2020, Vandana Sethhi, the pioneer of the campaign also covered protest against incidents of domestic violence, rape, acid attacks, etc. by using dialogues from popular films. Sethhi says that her campaign insists on Swacch Bhasha Swacch Bharat so that our language and mind is also clean like our surroundings. So far, 50000 people have signed up for her campaign and pledged support by committing not to use abusive words in their language and conversations. The campaign was one of the top 3 campaigns of 2020 to watch out for among others.
