= Expletive (linguistics) =

Word that does not add to the meaning of a sentence

An expletive is a word or phrase inserted into a sentence that is not needed to express the basic meaning of the sentence. It is regarded as semantically null or a placeholder. Expletives are not insignificant or meaningless in all senses; they may be used to give emphasis or tone, to contribute to the meter in verse, or to indicate tense.

The word "expletive" derives from the Latin word expletivus: serving to fill out or take up space.

In these examples in fact and indeed are expletives:

- The teacher was not, in fact, present.

- Indeed, the teacher was absent.

In conversation the expressions like and you know, when they are not meaningful, are expletives. The word so, used as an introductory particle (especially when used in answer to a question), has become a common modern expletive. Oaths or profanities may be expletives, as occurs in Shakespeare:

"Yes, by Saint Patrick, but there is, Horatio."

Hamlet, act 1, scene 5, line 134

"Zounds, sir, you are one of those that will not serve God if the devil bid you."

Othello, act 1, scene 1, line 109

== Profanity ==
The word "expletive" is also commonly defined as a profanity or curse word, apart from its grammatical function. An early example occurs in a sermon by Isaac Barrow published in 1741.

" … his oaths are no more than waste and insignificant words, deprecating being taken for serious, or to be understood that he meaneth anything by them, but only that he useth them as expletive phrases … to plump his speech, and fill up sentences."

Sermons on Evil-speaking, Isaac Barrow (1741)

Not all profanities are grammatical expletives (and vice versa). For example, in the sentence, "The bloody thing is shit, hey":

- "Bloody", as an attributive adjective, is an optional constituent of the sentence (thus not an expletive in the syntactical sense) and is a profanity.
- "Shit" is necessary to the sentence, and it is a profanity.
- "Hey" is not a profanity, but it is unnecessary.

=== "Expletive deleted" ===
The popularity of the phrase "expletive deleted" derives from the Watergate hearings in the United States in the 1970s, where the phrase was used to replace profanity that occurred in the transcripts of conversations that were recorded in the White House.

== "Do" as an expletive ==
At the start of the modern English era, the use of the word "do" as an expletive came into fashion with no fixed principle guiding it. It is distinguishable from "do" as a modal verb to convey that an action was recent as used in AAVE. The expletive "do" began to appear often in phrases such as "they do hunt" (rather than "they hunt"), and the practice was slow to fade from use. The lingering and indiscriminate use of the expletive "do" lent a point to Alexander Pope's jibe (which contains an example of "do" as an expletive):

"While expletives their feeble aid do join
And ten low words oft creep in one dull line."

An Essay on Criticism, Alexander Pope (1711)

== Expletive negation ==
Expletive negation is a sentence construction that contains one or more negations that, from a modern perspective, seem superfluous. The term originated in French language studies. An example of expletive negation is the "double-negative" in: "Nobody never lifted a finger to help her." Expletive negation is a standard usage in Old English, and in Middle English, as in this sentence, where, from a modern perspective, "not" and the negative marker "ne" seem to be not required:

"They moche doubted that they shold not fynde theyr counte ne tale."

Golden Legend, William Caxton 1483

== Syntactic expletive ==
In formal linguistic theories a syntactic expletive is a pronoun that is used at the start of a sentence or clause when an argument is syntactically required but the referent is not immediately known. The basic meaning of the clause is made explicit after the verb. Common forms of construction for sentences that contain a syntactic expletive begin with "it is", "here is", or "there is". The expletive serves as the grammatical subject of the independent clause that it begins. In a clause like "it is raining", the referent of the pronoun "it" is not obvious, and is the subject of discussion and alternate theories among linguists. Syntactic expletives have great significance in the study of the history of languages and cross-cultural comparisons. The term is distinct from the expletives of traditional grammar in that a syntactic expletive has a particular syntactical meaning.

Simple examples of syntactic expletives are the words it and there:

- It is a hammer that is needed.

- There are hammers in the toolbox.

Expletive, pleonastic, or dummy subjects have been crucial to syntactic argumentation. Their lack of semantic content and their staunch grammatical aspect provide a method to explore differences between syntax and semantics.

== See also ==
- Expletive attributive
- Expletive infixation
- Filler (linguistics)
- Morphology (linguistics)
