= Tmesis =

Compound or phrase with an interpolated word in the middle

Tmesis (Note: /ˈtmiːsɪs, təˈmiː-/; plural tmeses/ˈtmiːsiːs, təˈmiː-/; Ancient Greek: τμῆσις tmēsis – "a cutting" < τέμνω temnō, "I cut")) is either the dividing of a word into two parts, with another word inserted between those parts, thus forming a compound word, or, in a broader sense, a set phrase, such as a phrasal verb, with one or more words interpolated within, thus creating a separate phrase.

== Verbs ==
Tmesis of prefixed verbs (whereby the prefix is separated from the simple verb) was thought to be an original feature of the Ancient Greek language, common in the works of Homer (and later poetry), but not used in Attic prose. Such separable verbs are also part of the normal grammatical usage of some modern languages, such as Dutch and German.

=== Ancient Greek ===
Tmesis in Ancient Greek is something of a misnomer, since there is not necessarily a splitting of the prefix from the verb; rather, the consensus now seems to be that the separate prefix or pre-verb reflects a stage in the language where the prefix had not yet joined onto the verb. There are many examples in Homer's epics, the Iliad and the Odyssey, both of which preserve archaic features. One common and oft-cited example is κατὰ δάκρυα λείβων (kata dakrua leibōn; "shedding tears"), in which the pre-verb/prefix κατά- kata- "down" has not yet joined the verbal participle λείβων leibōn "shedding". In later Greek, these would combine to form the compound verb καταλείβων kataleibōn "shedding (in a downwards direction)".

=== Latin ===
Tmesis is found as a poetic or rhetorical device in classical Latin poetry, such as Ovid's Metamorphoses. Words such as circumdare ("to surround") are split apart with other words of the sentence in between, e.g. circum virum dant: "they surround the man" (circumdant (circum- prefix + dant)). This device is used in this way to create a visual image of surrounding the man by means of the words on the line. In the work of the poet Ennius, the literal splitting of the word cerebrum creates a vivid image: saxo cere comminuit brum "he shattered his brain with a rock."

=== Old Irish ===
Tmesis can be found in some early Old Irish texts, such as Audacht Morainn (The Testament of Morann). Old Irish verbs are found at the beginning of clauses (with VSO word order) and often possess prepositional pre-verbal particles, e.g. ad-midethar (ad- prefix) "evaluates, estimates". Tmesis occurs when the pre-verbal particle is separated from the verbal stem and the verbal stem is placed in clause final position while the pre-verbal particle/prefix remains at the beginning of the clause. This results in abnormal word order, e.g. ad- cruth caín -cichither "[the] fair form will be seen" (where ad-chichither is the future third-person singular passive of ad-cí "sees").

=== Old Norse ===
Examples of tmesis have been found in skaldic poetry. In addition to the use of kennings, skalds used tmesis to obscure the meaning of the poem. One use of tmesis was to divide the elements of personal names.

=== English ===
Numerous English words are colloquially intensified with the vulgar element -fucking-, such as unfuckingbelievable or fanfuckingtastic; or with variants such as -bloody- (un-bloody-believable, abso-bloody-lutely). This is known as expletive infixation. Tmesis often does not occur between a prefix and the root, but inside the root itself, as seen above in absobloodylutely and fanfuckingtastic.

==== Phrasal verbs ====
English employs a large number of phrasal verbs, consisting of a core verb and a particle; placing a word between them is sometimes called tmesis. For example:

Turn off the light OR Turn the light off.
Hand in the application OR Hand the application in.

When the object of the verb is 'it', tmesis is the norm, with turn it off and hand it in being nearly obligatory; *hand in it is only possible with contrastive intonation.

Such tmesis can also occur with an intransitive phrasal verb, typically with an adjunct. For example:

Come back tomorrow OR Come on back tomorrow.
Let's head out OR Let's head right out.

== See also ==
- Infix
- Interfix
- Affix
- Clitic
- Diacope
- Lexical diffusion
- Portuguese personal pronouns § Syntax on future verbs
- Separable verb
- Split infinitive
