= Double Is =

Reduplication of "is" (to be) copula verbs

The double "is", also known as the double copula, reduplicative copula, or Is-is, is the usage of the word "is" twice in a row (repeated copulae) when only one is necessary. Double is appears largely in spoken English, as in this example:

My point is, is that...

This construction is accepted by many English speakers in everyday speech, though some listeners interpret it as stumbling or hesitation, and others as "annoying".

Some prescriptive guides do not accept this usage, but do accept a circumstance where "is" appears twice in sequence when the subject happens to end with a copula; for example:

What my point is is that...

In the latter sentence, "What my point is" is a dependent clause, and functions as the subject; the second "is" is the main verb of the sentence. In the former sentence, "My point" is a complete subject, and requires only one "is" as the main verb of the sentence. Another use of "is is" is in constructions such as "All it is is a ..."

Some sources describe the usage after a dependent clause (the second example) as "non-standard" rather than generally correct.

== Copula other than "is" ==
The term double is, though commonly used to describe this practice, is somewhat inaccurate, since other forms of the word (such as "was" and "were") can be used in the same manner:

The problem being, is that...

According to the third edition of Fowler's Modern English Usage (as revised by Robert Burchfield), the double copula originated around 1971 in the United States and had spread to the United Kingdom by 1987.

== Explanations ==
The "double is" has been explained as an intensifier or as a way to keep the rhythm of the sentence. Some commentators recommend against using it as a matter of style, because some people find it awkward.

== Other uses of "double is" ==
While not grammatically related to a double copula, a "double is" may occur when referring to the word "is" directly. In these cases, the word "is" functions as a noun, and its general grammatical meaning is not considered. During the Clinton–Lewinsky scandal, such construction was infamously employed by Bill Clinton when he remarked "It depends on what the definition of the word 'is' is".

== See also ==
- Zero copula, omission of the copula in some languages or styles
- Pro-drop languages such as Spanish, where subject pronouns are often dropped and implied in their copulas
