= Epizeuxis =

Repetition of a word or phrase in immediate succession for emphasis

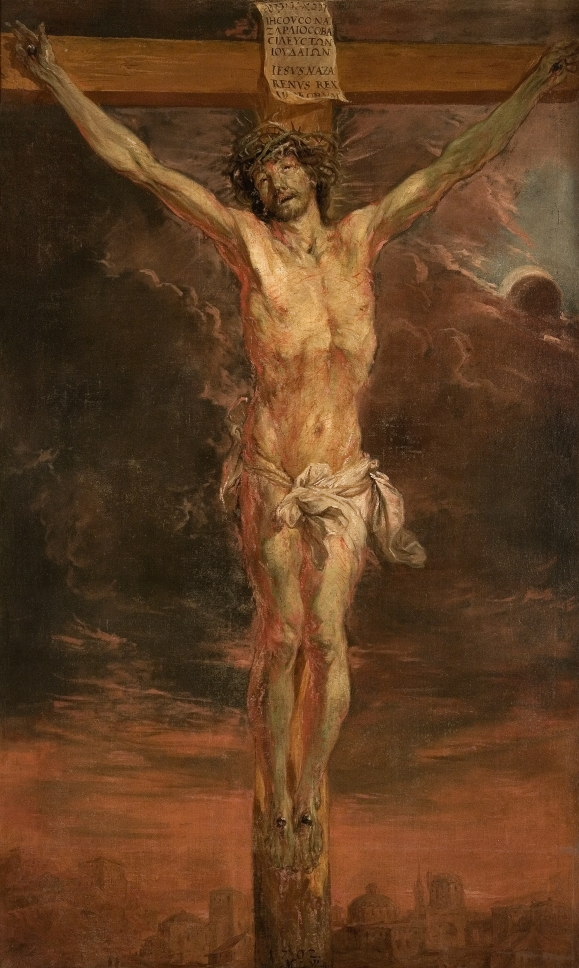
According to the Gospel, during the Crucifixion, Jesus' cried "My God, my God, why hast Thou forsaken me:" an example of epizeuxis.

In rhetoric, epizeuxis is the repetition of a word or phrase in immediate succession, typically within the same sentence, for vehemence or emphasis. A closely related rhetorical device is diacope, which involves word repetition that is broken up by a single intervening word, or a small number of intervening words.

The device may also be referred to as a cuckowspell, doublet, geminatio, palilogia, or underlay.

== Etymology ==
'Epizeuxis' derives from Greek epizeugnumi (Greek: ἐπιζευγνυμή; "to join together, to fasten") from epi- (Greek: ἐπι-; "upon") and zeugnúnai (Greek: ζευγνύναι; "to yoke").

== Rhetorical use ==
Epizeuxis is often used to emphasize the repeated word with forceful repetition, less subtle than other figures of repetition. It is frequently used to clarify or strengthen the intensity of information.

The device is also utilized to create an emotional appeal, thereby inspiring and motivating the audience. Often, epizeuxes are used in repetitive chants such as Donald Trump's "Lock her up" chant during the 2016 presidential election.

Epizeuxis can additionally be used for comic effect. For example, in the Monty Python sketch "Spam," the repetition of 'spam' is done for humorous effect, with menu items such as "Spam, Spam, Spam, Spam, Spam, Spam, baked beans, Spam, Spam, Spam, and Spam."

In the Bible, epizeuxes are often used to emphasize ideas; this is often emphasized by Hebrew grammar. For example, Isaiah 26:3— "thou wilt keep him in perfect peace—" Hebrew: שָׁלוֹם שָׁלוֹם (shalom shalom) is translated with 'perfect peace' to emphasize the magnitude of the peace. Another example is found in Genesis 25:30: "And Esau said to Jacob, Feed me, I pray thee, with that same red pottage." Hebrew, lacking English-like superlatives, repeats the adjective for red twice: Hebrew: הָאָדֹם הָאָדֹם, romanized: url (hah-ahdom, hah-ahdom). In turn, this emphasizes that the food is very red or deliciously red.

== Examples ==
- "Wake up, wake up, Deborah! / Wake up, wake up, break out in song!" — Judges 5:12
- "And about the ninth hour Jesus cried with a loud voice, saying, Eli, Eli, lama sabachthani? that is to say, My God, my God, why hast thou forsaken me?" — Matthew 27:46
- "Tomorrow, and tomorrow, and tomorrow / Creeps in this petty pace from day to day / To the last syllable of recorded time..." —William Shakespeare, Macbeth
- "O dark, dark, dark, amid the blaze of noon" — John Milton, Samson Agonistes.
- "Work, work, work, is the main thing" — Abraham Lincoln
- "The horror, the horror" — Joseph Conrad, Heart of Darkness
- "Never give in — never, never, never, never, in nothing great or small, large or petty, never give in except to convictions of honour and good sense. Never yield to force; never yield to the apparently overwhelming might of the enemy." — Winston Churchill
- "Well, Well, Well..." — John Lennon, Well Well Well
- "Rage, rage against the dying of the light." — Dylan Thomas, "Do not go gentle into that good night"
- "...I shambled after as usual as I've seen doing all my life after people that interest me, because the only people that interest me are the mad ones, the ones who are mad to live, mad to talk, desirous of everything at the same time, the ones that never yawn or say a commonplace thing, but burn, burn, burn like roman candles across the night." — Jack Kerouac, "On the Road"
- "Our top priority was, is and always will be education, education, education" — Tony Blair
- "Scotch, scotch, scotch, scotchy, scotchy scotch." — Ron Burgundy, Anchorman: The Legend of Ron Burgundy
- "Location, location, location" — an aphorism about the primacy of location in determining the value of real estate

== See also ==
- Anaphora
- Diacope
- Contrastive focus reduplication
