= Covariational conditional =

Construction of dependent and independent variables in English

The covariational conditional construction, also known as the comparative correlative construction, is the commonly used "the X'er, the Y'er" structure in English, for example:

- "The more I think about it, the less I understand."
- "The sooner, the better."

The structure is composed of two variables: an independent variable ('the X'er') and a dependent variable ("the Y'er").

In construction grammar this pattern is considered a construction because the pattern is not predictable from any other fact of English grammar already established about 'the'.

'The normally occurs with a head noun but in this construction, it requires a comparative phrase. The two major phrases resist classification as either noun phrases or clauses. The requirement that two phrases of this type be juxtaposed is another non-predictable aspect of the pattern. Because the pattern is not strictly predictable, a construction must be posited that specifies the particular form and function involved' (Goldberg 2006, 6).
