= Profanity =

Socially offensive form of language

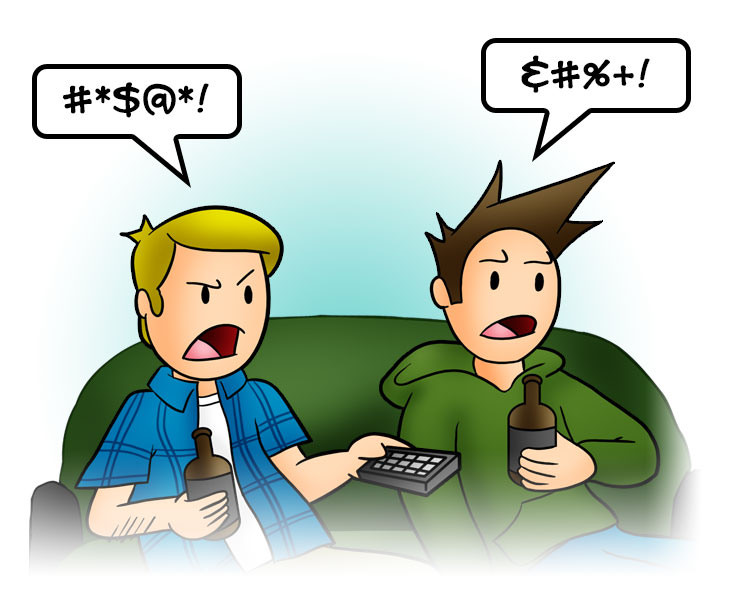
Profanity is often depicted in images by grawlixes, which substitute symbols for words.

Profanity, also known as swearing, cursing, or cussing, is the usage of notionally offensive words for a variety of purposes, including to demonstrate disrespect or negativity, to relieve pain, to express a strong emotion (such as anger, excitement, or surprise), as a grammatical intensifier or emphasis, or to express informality or conversational intimacy. In many formal or polite social situations, it is considered impolite (a violation of social norms), and in some religious groups it is considered a sin. Profanity includes slurs, but most profanities are not slurs, and there are many insults that do not use swear words.

Swear words can be discussed or even sometimes used for the same purpose without causing offense or being considered impolite if they are obscured (e.g. "fuck" becomes "f***" or "the f-word") or substituted with a minced oath like "flip".

== Etymology and definitions ==
Profanity may be described as offensive language, dirty words, or taboo words, among other descriptors. The term profane originates from classical Latin profanus, literally 'before (outside) the temple', pro meaning 'outside' and fanum meaning 'temple, sanctuary'. This further developed in Middle English with the meaning to desecrate a temple. In English, swearing is a catch-all linguistic term for the use of profanities, even if it does not involve taking an oath. The only other languages that use the same term for both profanities and oaths are French (jurer), Canadian French (sacrer), and Swedish (svära).

The use of cursing is similar to that of swearing, especially in the United States. Cursing originally referred specifically to the use of language to cast a curse on someone, and in American English it is still commonly associated with wishing harm on another. Equivalents to cursing are used similarly in Danish (bande), Italian (imprecare), and Norwegian (banne). The terms swearing and cursing have strong associations with the use of profanity in anger. Various efforts have been made to classify different types of profanity, but there is no widely accepted typology and many terms are used interchangeably.

Blasphemy and obscenity are used similarly to profanity, though blasphemy has retained its religious connotation. Similarly, Expletive is an English term used to refer to a profane expression, whose original meaning was to add words that change a sentence's length without changing its meaning. The use of expletive sometimes refers specifically to profanity as an interjection. Epithet is used to describe profanities directed at a specific person. Some languages do not have a general term for the use of profanities, and instead refer to it with the phrase "using bad language". These include Mandarin (zang hua), Portuguese (palavrão), Spanish (decir palabrotas), and Turkish (küfur etmek). Colloquial English terms include potty-mouth, defined by the OED as "A tendency to be foul-mouthed; (also) a foul-mouthed person".

== History and study ==
Historical profanity is difficult to reconstruct, as written records may not reflect spoken language. Despite being relatively well known compared to other linguistic mechanisms, profanity has historically been understudied because of its taboo nature. Profanity may be studied as an aspect of linguistics and sociology, or it can be a psychological and neurological subject. Besides interpersonal communication, understanding of profanity has legal implications and is related to theories of language learning.

In modern European languages, swearing developed from early Christianity, primarily through restrictions on taking God's name in vain in the Old Testament. Invocations of God were seen as attempts to call upon his power, willing something to be true or leveling a curse. Other mentions of God were seen as placing oneself over him, with the person uttering a name implying power over the name's owner.

Modern study of profanity as its own subject of inquiry had started by 1901. Sigmund Freud influenced study of the topic by positing that swearing reflects the subconscious, including feelings of aggression, antisocial inclinations, and the broaching of taboos. Significant activity began in the 1960s with writings on the subject by Ashley Montagu and Edward Sagarin, followed by increased study the following decade. Specific types of discriminatory profanity, such as ethnophaulism and homophobia, came to be described as part of a broader type of profanity, hate speech, toward the end of the 20th century. Another increase in the study of profanity took place with the onset of the 21st century.

== Subjects ==
Profanities have literal meanings, but they are invoked to indicate a state of mind, making them dependent almost entirely on connotation and emotional associations with the word, as opposed to literal denotation. The connotative function of profanity allows the denotative meaning to shift more easily, causing the word to shift until its meaning is unrelated to its origin or to lose meaning and impact altogether.

Literal meanings in modern profanity typically relate to religion, sex, or the human body, which creates a dichotomy between the use of highbrow religious swears and lowbrow anatomical swears. Languages and cultures place different emphasis on the subjects of profanity. Anatomical profanity is common in Polish, for example, while swearing in Dutch is more commonly in reference to disease. Words for excrement and for the buttocks have profane variants across most cultures. Though religious swears were historically more severe, modern society across much of the world has come to see sexual and anatomical swears to be more vulgar. Common profane phrases sometimes incorporate more than one category of profanity for increased effect. The Spanish phrase me cago en Dios y en la Puta Virgen (transl. I shit on God and on the prostitute Virgin) invokes scatological, religious, and sexual profanity. Other swear words do not refer to any subject, such as the English word bloody when used in its profane sense.

Not all taboo words are used in swearing, with many only being used in a literal sense. Clinical or academic terminology for bodily functions and sexual activity are distinct from profanity. This includes words such as excrement and copulate in English, which are not typically invoked as swears. Academics who study profanity disagree on whether literal use of a vulgar word can constitute a swear word. Conversely, words with greater connotative senses are not always used profanely. Bastard and son of a bitch are more readily used as general terms of abuse in English compared to terrorist and rapist, despite the latter two being terms being associated with strongly immoral behavior.

Some profane phrases are used metaphorically in a way that still retains elements of the original meaning, such as the English phrases all hell broke loose or shit happens, which carry the negative associations of hell and shit as undesirable places and things. Others are nonsensical when interpreted literally, like take a flying fuck in English as well as putain de merde (whore of shit) in French and porca Madonna (the sow of Madonna) in Italian.

=== Religion ===
A woman exclaiming "Oh My God!" before a dirtbike crash

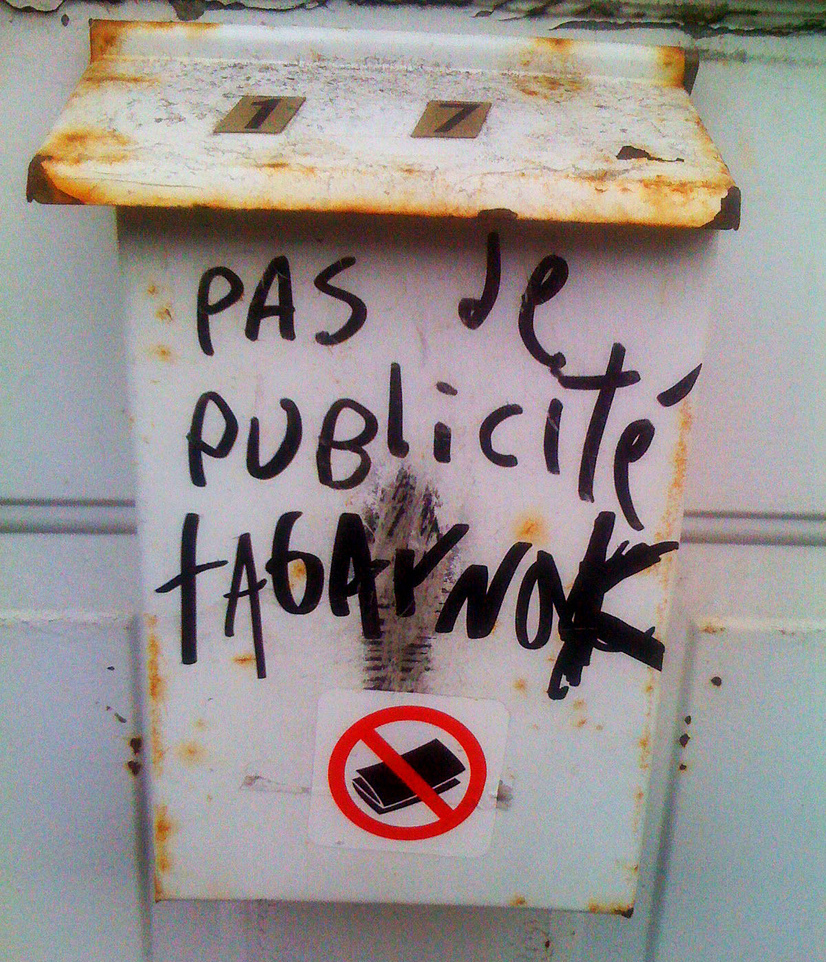
Graffiti on a mailbox in Quebec reading Pas de publicité tabarnak, meaning "no advertising mail" and using the sacre "tabarnak" (tabernacle)

A distinction is sometimes made between religious profanity, which is casual, and blasphemy, which is intentionally leveled against a religious concept. It was commonly believed among early civilizations that speaking about certain things can invoke them or bring about curses. Many cultures have taboos about speaking the names of evil creatures such as Satan because of these historical fears.

Religions commonly develop derogatory words for those who are not among their members. Medieval Christianity developed terms like heathen and infidel to describe outsiders. Secularization in the Western world has seen exclamations such as God! divorced from their religious connotations. Religious profanity is not inherent to all languages, being absent from Japanese, indigenous languages of the Americas, and most Polynesian languages.

European languages historically used the crucifixion of Jesus as a focal point for profane interjections. Phrases meaning "death of God" were used in languages like English ('Sdeath), French (Mort de Dieu), and Swedish (Guds död) Christian profanity encompasses both appeals to the divine, such as God or heaven, and to the diabolic, such as the Devil or hell. While the impact of religious swearing has declined in the Christian world, diabolic swearing remains profane in Germany and the Nordic countries. Islamic profanity lacks a diabolic element, referring only to divine concepts like Muhammad or holy places.

Words related to Catholicism, known as sacres, are used in Quebec French profanity, and are considered to be stronger than other profane words in French. Examples of sacres considered profane in Quebec are tabarnak (tabernacle), hostie (host), and sacrament (sacrament). When used as profanities, sacres are often interchangeable.

The Book of Leviticus indicates that blasphemous language warrants death, while the Gospel of Matthew implies condemnation of all swearing, though only the Quakers have imposed such a ban. Judaism and Brahmanism forbid mention of God's name entirely. In some countries, profanity words often have pagan roots that after Christian influence were turned from names of deities and spirits to profanity and used as such, like perkele in Finnish, which was believed to be an original name of the thunder god Ukko, the chief god of the Finnish pagan pantheon.

A widely used profanity in modern Hebrew is "Leh L'Azazel" (לך לעזאזל, "go to Azazel"), which can be translated into "damn you" or "get lost".

=== Anatomy and sexuality ===
The phrase "get fucked" spoken by an American

Profanity related to sexual activity, including insults related to genitals, exists across cultures. The specific aspects invoked are sensitive to a given culture, with differences in how much they emphasize ideas like incest or adultery. Certain types of sex acts, such as oral sex, anal sex, or masturbation, may receive particular attention. Verbs describing sexual activity are frequently profane, like fuck in English, foutre in French, fottere in Italian, jodido in Spanish, foda-se in Portuguese, and ебать (yebatˈ) in Russian. Words describing a person as one who masturbates are often used as terms of abuse, such as the English use of jerk-off and wanker. Terms for sexually promiscuous women can be used as profanity, such English terms like hussy and slut. Reference to prostitution brings its own set of profanities. Many profane words exist to refer to a prostitute, such as whore in English, putain in French, puttana in Italian, kurwa in Polish, блять (blyat') in Russian, זונה (zona) in Hebrew, شَرْمُوطَة (sharmuta) in Arabic, and puta in Spanish. Some languages, including German and Swedish, do not see significant use of sexual terms as profanity.

Profanities for the penis and vulva are often used as interjections. Penile interjections are often used in Italian (cazzo), Hebrew (זין, zain), Russian (хуй, khuy), and Spanish (carajo). Vulvar interjections are often used in Dutch (kut), Hungarian (picsa), Russian (пизда, pizda), Hebrew and Arabic (כּוּס and كَس respectively), Spanish (coño), and Swedish (fitta). Such terms, especially those relating to the vulva, may also be used as terms of abuse. Profanities related to testicles are less common and their function varies across languages. They may be used as interjections, such as in English (balls or bollocks), Italian (coglione), and Spanish (cojones). Dutch uses testicles as a term of abuse with klootzak.

Words for the buttocks are used as a term of disapproval in many languages, including English (ass or arse), French (cul), Polish (dupa), Russian (жопа, zhopa), and Spanish (culo). Similar words for the anus appear in languages like Danish (røvhul), English (asshole or arsehole), German (Arschloch), Icelandic (rassgat), Norwegian (rasshøl), and Polish (dupek). Excrement and related concepts are commonly invoked in profanity. European examples include shit in English, merde in French, Scheiße in German, خرء and חרא in Arabic and Hebrew respectively, and stronzo in Italian. An example in an East Asian language would be くそ (kuso) in Japanese.

=== Other subjects ===
Illness has historically been used to swear by wishing a plague on others. The names of various diseases are used as profane words in some languages; Pokkers (transl. pox) appears in both Danish and Norwegian as an exclamation and an intensifier. Death is another common theme in Asian languages such as Cantonese. Terminology of mental illness has become more prominent as profanity in the Western world, with terms such as idiot and retard challenging one's mental competency.

Profane phrases directed at the listener's mother exist across numerous major languages, though it is absent from Germanic languages with the exception of English. These phrases often include terms of abuse that implicate the subject's mother, such as son of a bitch in English or wáng bā dàn (transl. child of a cuckolded man) in Mandarin. Russian profanity places heavy emphasis on the sexual conduct of the listener's female relatives, either by describing sexual activity involving them or suggesting that the listener engage in activities with them. Aboriginal Australian languages sometimes invoke one's deceased ancestors in profanity.

The names of political ideologies are sometimes invoked as swear words by their opponents. Fascist is commonly used as an epithet in the modern era, replacing historical use of radical. Far-left groups and anti-capitalist have historically used words like capitalist and imperialist as terms of abuse, while anti-communist speakers use communist in the same manner. The use of political terms in a profane sense often leads to the term becoming less impactful or losing relevance as a political descriptor entirely.

Words for animals can be used as terms of abuse despite not being inherently profane, commonly referencing some attribute of the animal. Examples in English include bitch to demean a woman or louse to describe someone unwanted. They may also be used in interjections like the Italian porco dio (transl. pig of a God). Animal-related profanity is distinct from other forms in that it is used similarly across different languages. Terms for dogs are among the most common animal swears across languages, alongside those for cows, donkeys, and pigs. Swear words related to monkeys are common in Arabic and East Asian cultures.

Slurs are words that target a specific demographic. These are used to project xenophobia and prejudice, often through the use of stereotypes. They typically develop in times of increased contact of conflict between different races or ethnic groups, including times of war between two or more nations. Terms for minority groups are sometimes used as swears. This can apply to both profane terms such as kike or non-profane terms such as gay. Many of these are culture-specific. In a case of using the name of one group to demean another, Hun came to be associated with a brutish caricature of Germans, first during the Renaissance and again during World War I. Some terms for people of low class or status can become generically profane or derogatory. English examples include villain, lewd, and scum.

== Grammar and function ==
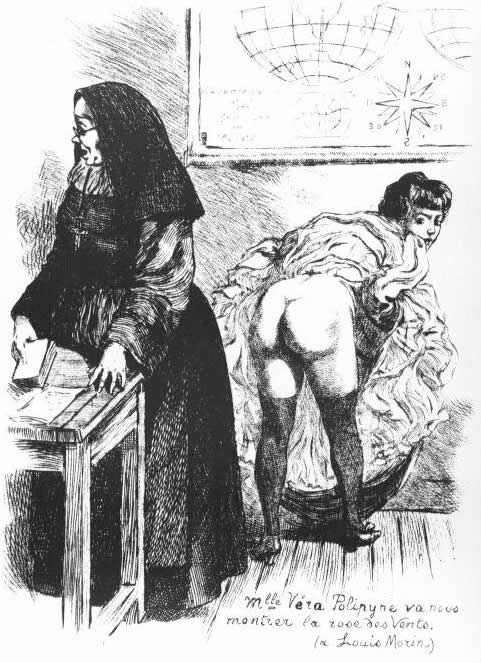
Exposing the buttocks is considered profane in many cultures.

Profanity is used to indicate the speaker's emotional state, and the negative associations of swear words mean they are often emotionally charged. Expressions of anger and frustration are the most common reason for swearing. Such expressions are associated with abusive profanity, which is the most negatively charged and is specifically chosen to insult or offend the subject. This may take the form of a direct insult, such as calling the subject an asshole, or by addressing the subject profanely, such as telling someone to fuck off. It can also be used to indicate contempt. Cathartic profanity is used as an expression of annoyance, and it is often considered less rude than profanity directed at a specific subject. Profanity can be used as a statement of agreement or disagreement, though disagreement is more common; the hell it is and my ass are examples of English profanities that indicate disagreement. The potent nature of swearing means that it can be used to gain attention, including the use of profanity to cause shock. In some circumstances, swearing can be used as a form of politeness, such as when a speaker gives positive reinforcement by describing something as pretty fucking good.

Propositional or controlled swearing is done consciously, and speakers choose their wording and how to express it. This is more common when using descriptive swearing. Non-propositional or reflexive swearing is done involuntarily as an emotional response to excitement or displeasure. Frequent swearing can become a habit, even if the speaker does not have a specific intention of being profane.

Profanity is often used as a slot filler, which functions as a modifier, and modifying a noun with a swear is commonly used to indicate dislike. A profane word can modify words as an adjective, such as in it's a bloody miracle, or as an adverb, such as in they drove damn fast. One type of adverbial profanity is to use it as a modal adverb, such as in no you fucking can't. Compound words can be created to create a new modifier, such as pisspoor. Many European languages use profanity to add emphasis to question words in the form of who the hell are you? or with a preposition in the form of what in God's name is that?. Modifier profanities are frequently used as an expletive attributive, or intensifiers that put emphasis on specific ideas. These commonly take the form of interjections to express strong emotion, such as the English examples bloody hell and for fuck's sake. Such stand-alone profanities are among the most common in natural speech. Expletive infixation is the use of a profane word as an intensifier inside of another word, such as modifying absolutely to become abso-fucking-lutely. Some languages use swear words that can generically replace nouns and verbs. This is most common in Russian.

Though profanity exists in nearly all cultures, there is variation in when it is used and how it affects the meaning of speech. Each language has unique profane phrases influenced by culture. Japanese is sometimes described as having no swear words, though it has a concept of warui kotoba (transl. bad words) that are not based on taboos but are otherwise functionally equivalent to swears. One linguistic theory proposes that sound symbolism influences the pronunciation of profanities. This includes the suggestion that profanities are more likely to include plosives, but this remains unstudied, especially outside of Indo-European languages.

The use of profanity is the most common way to express taboo ideas. The dichotomy between its taboo nature and its prevalence in day-to-day life is studied as the "swearing paradox". It is used casually in some social settings, which can facilitate bonding and camaraderie, denote a social environment as informal, and mark the speaker as part of an in-group. The way speakers use profanity in social settings allows them to project their identity and personality through communication style, and in some circumstances it can be used as a method used to impress one's peers. Stylistic swearing is used to add emphasis or intensity to speech, which can be used to emphasize an idea in an aggressive or authoritative fashion, make an idea memorable, or produce a comedic effect.

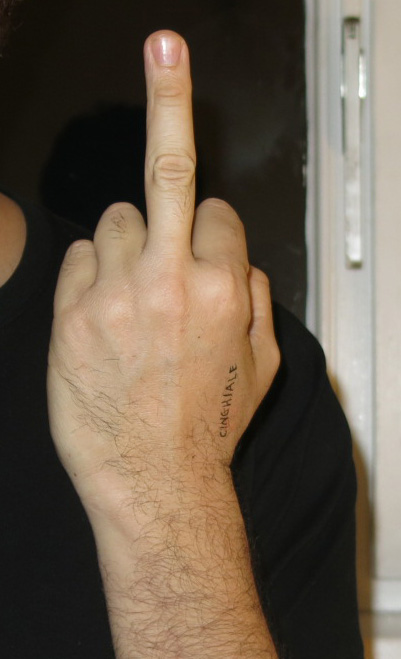
The finger, an obscene hand gesture

Profanity often presents as formulaic language, in which specific words can only be used in specific phrases, often developed through grammaticalization. Many of these phrases allow words to be swapped, presenting variations on a phrase like what in the bloody heck, why in the flamin' hell, and how in the fuckin' hell. Profane phrases can be used as anaphoric pronouns, such as replacing him with the bastard in tell the bastard to mind his own business. They can similarly be used to support a noun instead of replacing it, such as in John is a boring son of a bitch. Though profanity is usually associated with taboo words, obscene non-verbal acts such as hand gestures may be considered profane. Spitting in someone's direction has historically been seen as a strong insult. Exposure of certain body parts, often the genitals or buttocks, is also seen as profane in many parts of the world.

Though cursing often refers to the use of profanity in general, it can refer to more specific phrases of harm such as damn you or a pox on you. Historically, people swore by or to the ideas that they were invoking, instead of swearing at something. Oaths in which the speaker swears by something, such as by God, can be used as interjections or intensifiers, typically without religious connotation. This is especially common in Arabic. Self-immolating oaths, such as I'll be damned, involve speakers casting harm upon themselves. These are often invoked as conditional statements based on whether something is true—I'll be damned if... Profanity directed at an individual can take the form of an unfriendly suggestion. English examples include go to hell and kiss my ass. Some profanities, such as your mother!, imply taboos or swear words without using them explicitly.

== Social perception ==
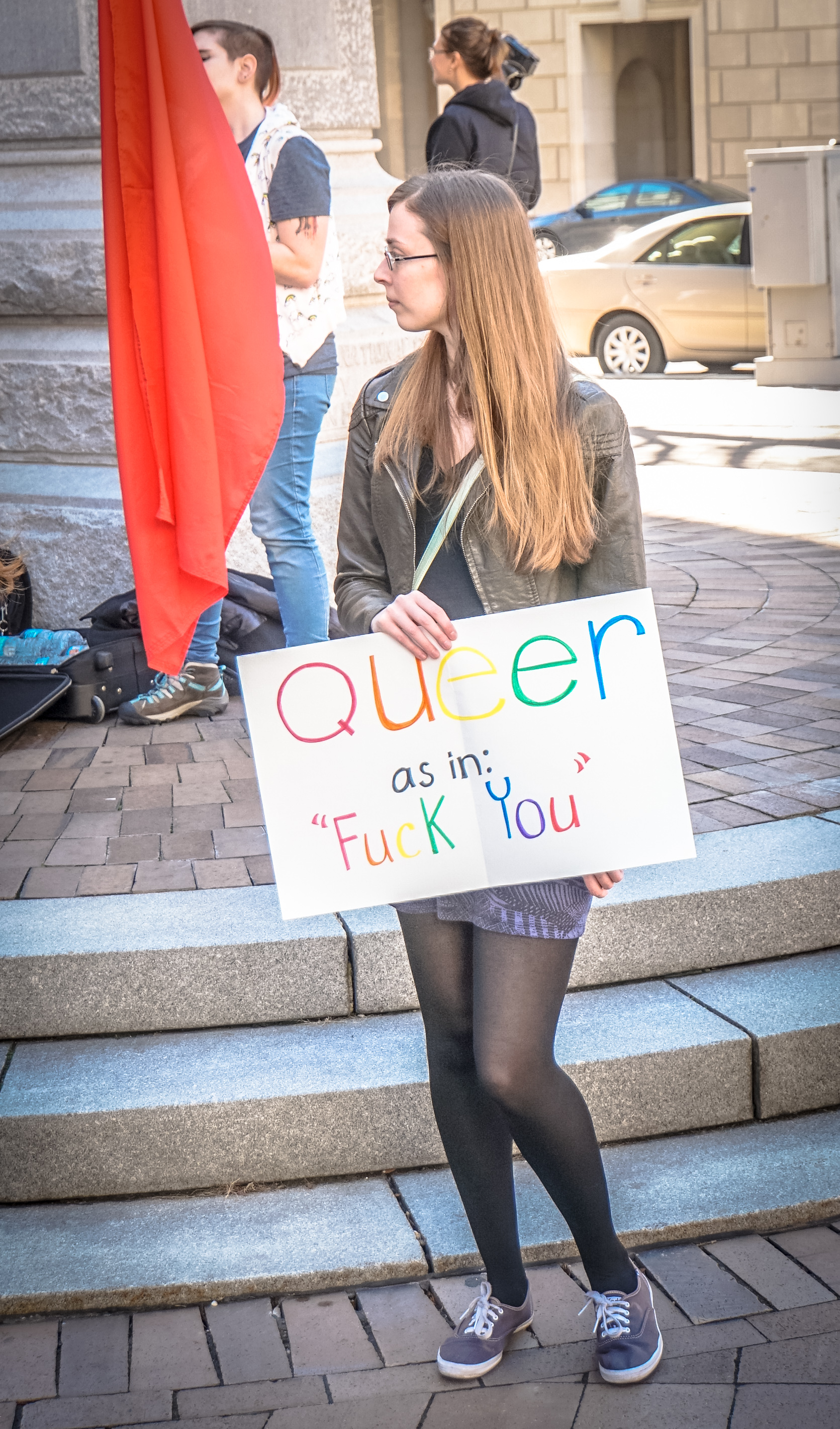
Pejorative terms like queer may be reappropriated by the people they are directed against.

Whether speech is profane depends on context, because what is taboo or impolite in one environment might not be in another. Swear words vary in their intensity, and speakers of a language might disagree that weaker swear words are actually profane. Isolated profanities are often seen as more profane than those used in context.

The identity of the speaker affects how profanity is seen, as different cultures may hold classes, sexes, age groups, and other identities to different standards. Profanity is often seen as more socially acceptable when coming from men, and it is commonly associated with machismo. Profanity varies in how it affects a speaker's credibility. It can be seen as unprofessional in some circumstances, but it can make an argument more persuasive in others. Milder words can become more impactful in different circumstances; cheat may be more provocative in schools or gambling clubs, and informer replaces crook as a term of abuse for a dishonest person in a criminal setting. Profanity is often associated with lower class professions like soldiers and carters.

Expectancy violations theory holds that expectations about a speaker's behavior come from impressions based not only on the speaker's identity, but how the specific speaker typically communicates and the socially expected way to speak to a given listener. Swearing in formal contexts is a greater violation of expectations than swearing in informal conversation. Whether the profanity is spoken in public or private is also a factor in social acceptability. Conversations that involve profanity are correlated with other informal manners of speech, such as slang, humor, and discussion of sexuality.

Native speakers of a language can intuitively decide what language is appropriate for a given context. Those still learning a language, such as children and non-native speakers, are more likely to use profane language without realizing that it is profane. Acceptable environments for profanity are learned in childhood as children find themselves chastised for swearing in some places more than others. Swearing is often milder among young children, and they place more stigma on terms that are not seen as profane by adults, like fart or dork. Young children are more likely to use the mildest terms as swear words, such as pooh-pooh. Adolescents develop an understanding of double meanings in terms like balls.

The severity of a swear word may decline over time as it is repeated. In some cases, slurs can be reclaimed by the targeted group when they are used ironically or in a positive context, such as queer to refer to the LGBTQ community. People who speak multiple languages often have stronger emotional associations with profanity in their native languages over that of languages that they acquire later. The severity of a profane term can vary between dialects within the same language. Publishers of dictionaries must take profanity into consideration when deciding what words to include, especially when they are subject to obscenity laws. They may be wary of appearing to endorse the use of profane language by its inclusion. Slang dictionaries have historically been used to cover profanity in lieu of more formal dictionaries.

In some cultures, there are situations where profanity is good etiquette. A tradition exists in some parts of China that a bride was expected to speak profanely to her groom's family in the days before the wedding, and one Aboriginal Australian culture uses profanity to denote class.

== Censorship and avoidance ==
Profane language is often subject to regulation in media. This icon, used by PEGI, indicates that a video game may contain "bad language".

The idea of censoring taboo ideas exists in all cultures. Swearing inappropriately can be punished socially, and public swearing can bring about legal consequences. There is disagreement as to whether freedom of speech should permit all forms of profane speech, including hate speech, or if such forms of speech can be justifiably restricted. Censorship is used to restrict or penalize profanity, and governments may implement laws that disallow certain acts of profanity, including legal limitations on the broadcast of profanity over radio or television. Broadcasting has unique considerations as to what is considered acceptable, including its presence in the home and children's access to broadcasts.

Profanity may be avoided when discussing taboo subjects through euphemisms. Euphemisms were historically used to avoid invoking the names of malevolent beings. Euphemisms are commonly expressed as metaphors, such as make love or sleep with as descriptors of sexual intercourse. Euphemisms can be alternate descriptors such as white meat instead of breast meat, or they may be generic terms such as unmentionables. Minced oaths are euphemisms that modify swear words until they are no longer profane, such as darn instead of damn in English.

Substitution is another form of euphemism, with English examples including the replacement of fuck with the f-word or effing and the use of "four-letter words" to refer to profanity in general. Chinese and some Southeast Asian languages use puns and sound-alikes to create alternate swear words. The Chinese word for bird, niao, rhymes with the Chinese word for penis and is frequently invoked as a swear. The Cockney dialect of English uses rhyming slang to alter terms, including profanity; titty is rhymed as Bristol city, which is then abbreviated as bristols.

Speakers and authors may engage in self-censorship under legal or social pressure. In the 21st century, censorship through social pressure is associated with political correctness in Western society. This has led to the intentional creation of new euphemisms to avoid terms that may be stigmatizing. Some become widely accepted, such as substance abuse for drug addiction, while others are ignored or derided, such as differently abled for disabled.

== Physiology and neurology ==
The brain processes profanity differently than it processes other forms of language. Intentional controlled swearing is associated with the brain's left hemisphere, while reflexive swearing is associated with the right hemisphere. Swearing is associated with both language-processing parts of the brain, the left frontal and temporal lobes, as well as the emotion-processing parts, the right cerebrum and the amygdala. The association of emotional swearing with the amygdala and other parts of the limbic system suggests that some uses of profanity are related to the fight-or-flight response.

Profanity requires more mental processing than other forms of language, and the use of profanity is easier to remember when recalling a conversation or other speech. Exposure to profanity leads to higher levels of arousal, and it can cause increases in heart rate and electrodermal activity as part of a fight-or-flight response. Swearing has also been shown to increase pain tolerance, especially among people who do not regularly swear.

Compulsive swearing is called coprolalia, and it is associated with neurological conditions such as Tourette syndrome, dementia, and epilepsy. The ability to use profanity can remain intact even when neurological trauma causes aphasia. Frequent swearing is more common among people with damage to the brain or other parts of the nervous system. Damage to the ventromedial prefrontal cortex can negatively affect one's ability to control their use of profanity and other socially inappropriate behaviors. Damage to Broca's area and other language-processing regions of the brain can similarly make people prone to outbursts. Damage to the right hemisphere limits the ability to understand and regulate the emotional content of one's speech.

== Legality ==
=== Australia ===
In every Australian state and territory it is a crime to use offensive, indecent or insulting language in or near a public place. These offences are classed as summary offences. This means that they are usually tried before a local or magistrates court. Police also have the power to issue fixed penalty notices to alleged offenders. It is a defence in some Australian jurisdictions to have "a reasonable excuse" to conduct oneself in the manner alleged.

=== Brazil ===
In Brazil, the Penal Code does not contain any penalties for profanity in public immediately. However, direct offenses against one can be considered a crime against honor, with a penalty of imprisonment of one to three months or a fine. The analysis of the offence is considered "subjective", depending on the context of the discussion and the relationship between the parts.

=== Canada ===
Section 175 of Canada's Criminal Code makes it a criminal offence to "cause a disturbance in or near a public place" by "swearing [...] or using insulting or obscene language". Provinces and municipalities may also have their laws against swearing in public. For instance, the Municipal Code of Toronto bars "profane or abusive language" in public parks. In June 2016, a man in Halifax, Nova Scotia, was arrested for using profane language at a protest against Bill C-51.

=== India ===
Sections 294A and 294B of Indian penal code have legal provisions for punishing individuals who use inappropriate or obscene words (either spoken or written) in public that are maliciously deliberate to outrage religious feelings or beliefs. In February 2015, a local court in Mumbai asked police to file a first information report against 14 Bollywood celebrities who were part of the stage show of All India Bakchod, a controversial comedy stage show known for vulgar and profanity based content. In May 2019 during the election campaign, Indian Prime Minister Narendra Modi listed out the abusive words the opposition Congress party had used against him and his mother during their campaign.

In January 2016, a Mumbai-based communications agency initiated a campaign against profanity and abusive language called "Gaali free India" (gaali is the Hindi word for profanity). Using creative ads, it called upon people to use swachh (clean) language on the lines of Swachh Bharat Mission for nationwide cleanliness. It further influenced other news media outlets who further raised the issue of abusive language in the society especially incest abuses against women, such as "mother fucker".

In an increasing market for OTT content, several Indian web series have been using profanity and expletives to gain attention of the audiences.

=== Italy ===
Until 1999, uttering blasphemies in public was considered a criminal misdemeanor in Italy (although enforcement was all but non-existent), although nowadays, it has been downgraded to an administrative misdemeanor. Some local administrations still ban the practice. For example, after the curate complained about the frequency of blasphemous profanity in the parish recreation centre, the comune of Brignano Gera d'Adda banned the practice in the civic centre, and in all places of retail business, be it public or private. As of July 2011, only obscenities that are directly related to God are classified as a bestemmia under Italian law. Any insult to Mary or the various saints do not actually represent a bestemmia, or any violation of existing laws and rules.

=== New Zealand ===
In New Zealand, the Summary Offences Act 1981 makes it illegal to use "indecent or obscene words in or within hearing of any public place". However, if the defendant has "reasonable grounds for believing that his words would not be overheard" then no offence is committed. Also, "the court shall have regard to all the circumstances pertaining at the material time, including whether the defendant had reasonable grounds for believing that the person to whom the words were addressed, or any person by whom they might be overheard, would not be offended".

=== Pakistan ===
Political leaders in Pakistan have been consistently picked up for using profane, abusive language. While there is no legislation to punish abusers, the problem aggravated with abusive language being used in the parliament and even against women.

=== Philippines ===
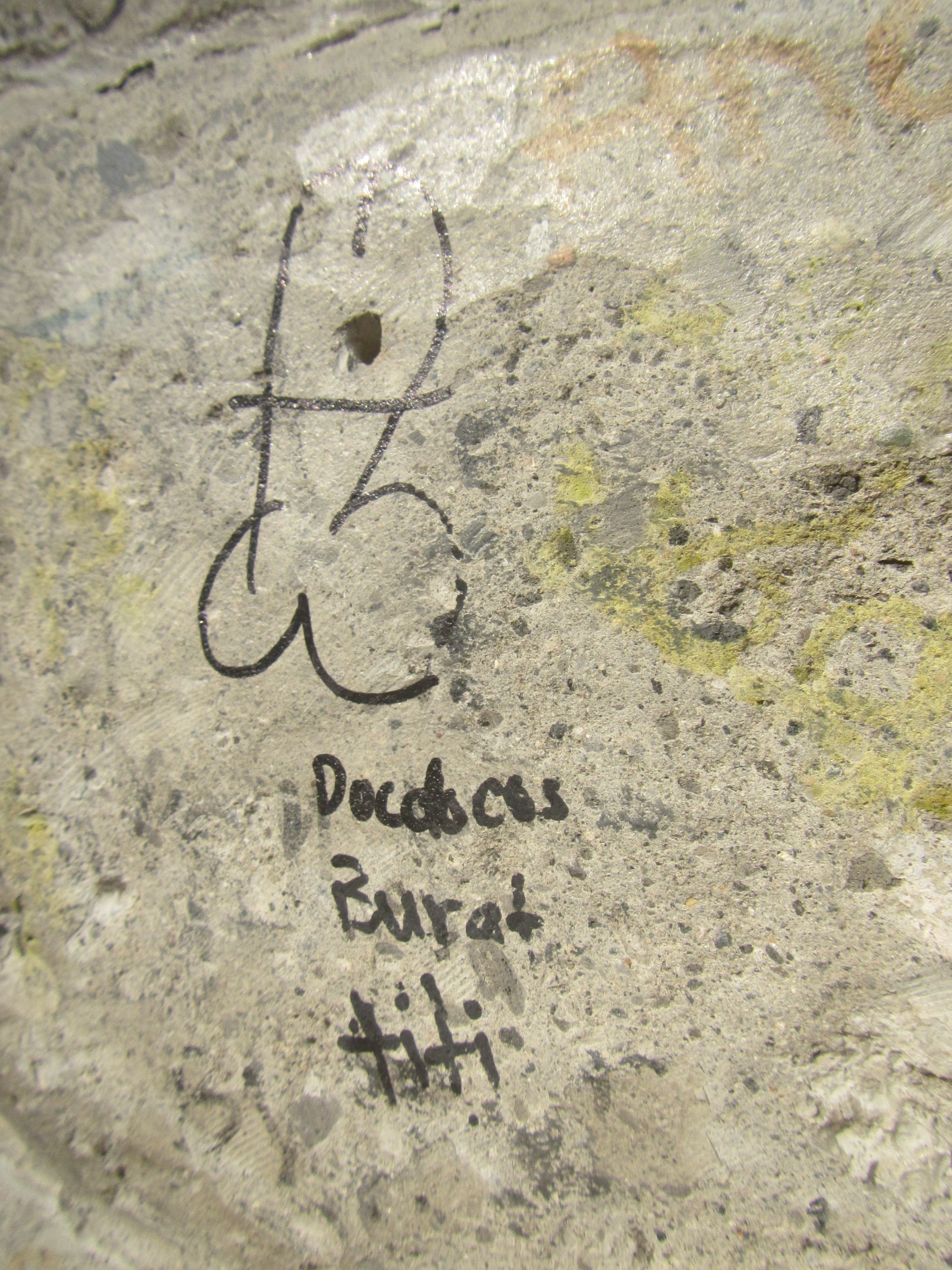
Tagalog-language graffiti in San Juan, Metro Manila, depicting a penis and the text Docdocos burat titi, claiming that "Docdocos" has an uncircumcised penis.

The Department of Education in the Philippine city of Baguio expressed that while cursing was prohibited in schools, children were not following this prohibition at home. Thus as part of its anti profanity initiative, in November 2018, the Baguio city government in the Philippines passed an anti profanity law that prohibits cursing and profanity in areas of the city frequented by children. This move was welcomed by educators and the Department of Education in Cordillera.

=== Russia ===
Swearing in public is an administrative crime in Russia. However, law enforcement rarely targets swearing people. The punishment is a fine of 500–1000 roubles or even a 15-day imprisonment.

=== United Kingdom ===
==== In public ====
Swearing, in and of itself, is not usually a criminal offence in the United Kingdom although in context may constitute a component of a crime. However, it may be a criminal offence in Salford Quays under a public spaces protection order which outlaws the use of "foul and abusive language" without specifying any further component to the offence, although it appears to be unclear as to whether all and every instance of swearing is covered. Salford City Council claims that the defence of "reasonable excuse" allows all the circumstances to be taken into account. In England and Wales, swearing in public where it is seen to cause harassment, alarm or distress may constitute an offence under section 5(1) and (6) of the Public Order Act 1986. In Scotland, a similar common law offence of breach of the peace covers issues causing public alarm and distress.

==== In the workplace ====
In the United Kingdom, swearing in the workplace can be an act of gross misconduct under certain circumstances. In particular, this is the case when swearing accompanies insubordination against a superior or humiliation of a subordinate employee. However, in other cases, it may not be grounds for instant dismissal. According to a UK site on work etiquette, the "fact that swearing is a part of everyday life means that we need to navigate away through a day in the office without offending anyone, while still appreciating that people do swear. Of course, there are different types of swearing and, without spelling it out, you really ought to avoid the 'worst words' regardless of who you're talking to". Within the UK, the appropriateness of swearing can vary largely by a person's industry of employment, though it is still not typically used in situations where employees of a higher position than oneself are present.

In 2006, The Guardian reported that "36% of the 308 UK senior managers and directors having responded to a survey accepted swearing as part of workplace culture", but warned about specific inappropriate uses of swearing such as when it is discriminatory or part of bullying behaviour. The article ended with a quotation from Ben Wilmott (Chartered Institute of Personnel and Development): "Employers can ensure professional language in the workplace by having a well-drafted policy on bullying and harassment that emphasises how bad language has potential to amount to harassment or bullying."

=== United States ===
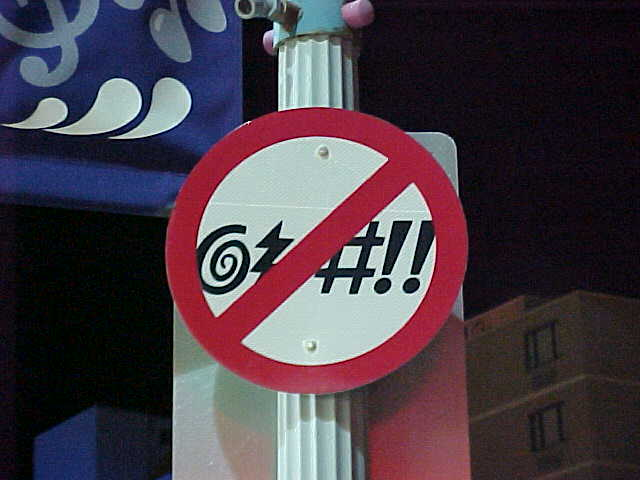
Local law in Virginia Beach prohibits the use of profanity along the boardwalk of Atlantic Avenue

In the United States, courts have generally ruled that the government does not have the right to prosecute someone solely for the use of an expletive, which would be a violation of their right to free speech enshrined in the First Amendment. On the other hand, they have upheld convictions of people who used profanity to incite riots, harass people, or disturb the peace. In 2011, a North Carolina statute that made it illegal to use "indecent or profane language" in a "loud and boisterous manner" within earshot of two or more people on any public road or highway was struck down as unconstitutional. In 2015, the city of Myrtle Beach, South Carolina passed an ordinance that makes profane language punishable with fines up to $500 or 30 days in jail. An amount of $22,000 was collected from these fines in 2017 alone.

== Religious views ==
=== Judaism ===
Rabbi Yisroel Cotlar wrote in Chabad.org that Judaism forbids the use of profanity as contradicting the Torah's command to "Be holy", which revolves around the concept of separating oneself from worldly practices (including the use of vulgar language). The Talmud teaches that the words that leave the mouth make an impact on the heart and mind; he stated that the use of profanity thus causes the regression of the soul. Judaism thus teaches that shemirat halashon (guarding one's tongue) is one of the first steps to spiritual improvement.

=== Christianity ===
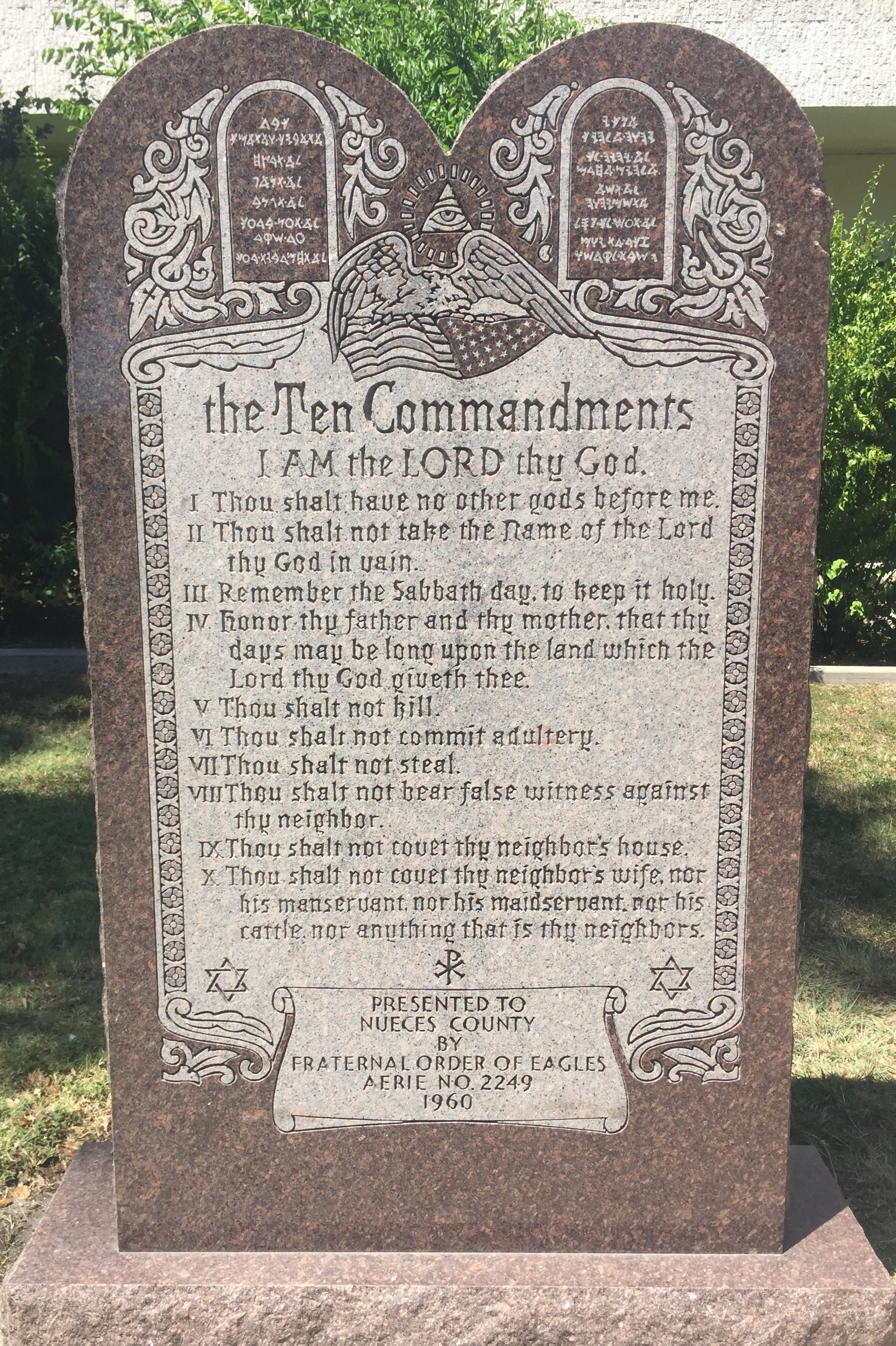
"Thou shalt not take the name of the Lord thy God in vain" is one of the Ten Commandments of Christianity and Judaism.

Various Christian writers have condemned the use of "foul language" as being sinful, a position held since the time of the early Church. To this end, the Bible commands including "Don't use foul or abusive language. Let everything you say be good and helpful, so that your words will be an encouragement to those who hear them" (Ephesians 4:29) and also "Let there be no filthiness nor foolish talk nor crude joking, which are out of place, but instead let there be thanksgiving" (Ephesians 5:4). These teachings are echoed in Sirach 20:19, Sirach 23:8-15, and Sirach 17:13-15, all of which are found in the Deuterocanon/Apocrypha. Jesus taught that "by your words you will be justified, and by your words you will be condemned." (cf. Matthew 12:36-37), with revilers being listed as being among the damned in 1 Corinthians 6:9-10. Profanity revolving around the dictum "Thou shalt not take the name of the Lord thy God in vain", one of the Ten Commandments, is regarded as blasphemy as Christians regard it as "an affront to God's holiness". Paul the Apostle defines the ridding of filthy language from one's lips as being evidence of living in a relationship with Jesus (cf. Colossians 3:1-10). The Epistle to the Colossians teaches that controlling the tongue "is the key to gaining mastery over the whole body." The Didache 3:3 included the use of "foul language" as being part of the lifestyle that puts one on the way to eternal death. The same document commands believers not to use profanity as it "breeds adultery". John Chrysostom, an early Church Father, taught that those engaged in the use of profanity should repent of the sin. The Epistle of James holds that "blessing God" is the primary function of the Christian's tongue, not speaking foul language. Saint Tikhon of Zadonsk, a bishop of Eastern Orthodox Church, lambasted profanity and blasphemy, teaching that it is "extremely unbefitting [for] Christians" and that believers should guard themselves from ever using it.

=== Islam ===
According to Ayatullah Ibrahim Amini, the use of "bad words" is haram in Islam. Additionally, impertinence and slander are considered immoral acts.

== See also ==
- Animal epithet – Name for a person or group, by association with some perceived quality of an animal
- Bleep censor – Beep used to censor profanity
- Expletive deleted – Censored or redacted profanity
- Fighting words – Speech or writing intended to incite hatred or violence
- Flyting – Exchange of insults in the form of verse
- Lists of pejorative terms for people
- Maledictology – Research into cursing and swearing
- Obscene gesture – Expression of contempt
- Profanity in science fiction
- Scunthorpe problem – Problem caused by profanity filters on the Internet
- Sexual slang – Terms and phrases relating to sexual activities
- Swear jar – Container used for storing money from informal fines for swearing
- Use–mention distinction – Distinction between using a word and mentioning it
- Verbal abuse – Form of abuse using verbal communication for intent to harm person and entity
- Vulgarism – Expression considered non-standard, characteristic of uneducated speech or writing
- Wordfilter – Script used to censor words or phrases on the internet
