= Thou shalt not take the name of the Lord thy God in vain =

One of the Ten Commandments

"Thou shalt not take the name of the LORD thy God in vain" (KJV; also "You shall not make wrongful use of the name of the Lord your God" (NRSV) and variants, Biblical Hebrew: לֹא תִשָּׂא אֶת-שֵׁם-יהוה אֱלֹהֶיךָ לַשָּׁוְא, romanized: Lōʾ ṯiśśāʾ ʾeṯ-šēm-YHWH ʾĕlōhēḵā laššāwəʾ) is the second or third (depending on numbering) of God's Ten Commandments to man in Judaism and Christianity.

Exodus 20:7 and Deuteronomy 5:11 read:

Thou shalt not take the name of the LORD thy God in vain; for the LORD will not hold him guiltless that taketh his name in vain.

Based on this commandment, Second Temple Judaism by the Hellenistic period developed a taboo of pronouncing the name YHWH (reconstructed by modern scholars as Yahweh) at all, resulting in the replacement of the Tetragrammaton by "Adonai" (literally "my lord") in pronunciation.

Throughout most of Jewish and Christian history, the commandment in the Hebrew Bible has been understood to be prohibiting the misuse of God's name via abusive speech, false oaths, or magical invocations; but not about the use of the name itself. More recent scholarship has argued the original meaning of the command is not related to using God's personal name irreverently, but the misrepresentation of God's identity by Israel.

== In Judaism ==
=== Hebrew Bible ===
The Hebrew לא תשא לשוא is translated literally as "you should not bear for vanity". The word here translated as "in vain" is שוא (shav' 'emptiness', 'vanity', 'emptiness of speech', 'lying'), while 'take' is נשא nasa' 'to lift', 'carry', 'bear', 'take', 'take away' (appearing in the second person as תשא). The expression "to take in vain" is also translated less literally as "to misuse" or variants.

Some have interpreted the commandment to be against perjury, since invoking God's name in an oath was considered a guarantee of the truth of a statement or promise. Other scholars believe the original intent was to prohibit using the name in the magical practice of conjuration.

Hebrew Bible passages also refer to God's name being profaned by hypocritical behavior of people and false representation of God's words or character.

In the Hebrew Bible, as well as in the Ancient Near East and throughout classical antiquity more generally, an oath is a conditional self-curse invoking deities that are asked to inflict punishment on the oath-breaker. There are numerous examples in the Book of Samuel of people strengthening their statements or promises with the phrase, "As surely as YHWH lives ..." and such statements are referred to in Jeremiah as well. The value of invoking punishment from God was based on the belief that God cannot be deceived or evaded. For example, a narrative in the Book of Numbers describes how such an oath is to be administered by a priest to a woman suspected of adultery, with the expectation that the accompanying curse will have no effect on an innocent person.

Such oaths may have been used in civil claims, regarding supposed theft, for example, and the commandment is repeated in the context of honest dealings between people in Leviticus 19:12. At one point of the account of the dedication of the Temple of Solomon, Solomon prays to God, asking him to hear and act upon curses uttered in a dispute that are then brought before his altar, to distinguish between the person in the right and the one in the wrong.

The prophet Isaiah rebuked Israel as the Babylonian captivity drew near, pointing out that they bore the name of God, and swore by him, but their swearing was hypocritical since they had forsaken the exclusive worship of God for the worship of idols. The Israelites had been told in Leviticus that sacrificing their children to idols and then coming to worship God caused God's name to be profaned, thus breaking the commandment. According to the Book of Jeremiah, God told him to look around Jerusalem, asserting that he would not be able to find an honest man – "Even when they say, 'As YHWH lives,' they are sure to be swearing falsely." Jeremiah refers to a situation in which Israelites repented and took oaths in God's name – only to renege by reclaiming as slaves persons they had freed as part of their repentance. This hypocritical act was also considered profaning God's name. In Jeremiah 12, an opportunity is also described for Israel's neighbors to avoid destruction and prosper if they stop swearing by their idol and swear only by the name of God.

=== Classical antiquity ===
Philo pointed out that it is natural that God would swear by himself, even though this is "a thing impossible for anyone else".

=== In practice ===
To avoid coming under guilt by accidentally misusing God's name, Jewish scholars do not write or pronounce the proper name in most circumstances, but use substitutes such as "Adonai" ("the Lord") or "HaShem" ("the Name"). In English translations of the Bible, the name Adonai is often translated "Lord", while the proper name YHWH represented by the tetragrammaton is often indicated by the use of capital and small capital letters, Lᴏʀᴅ.

Rabbi Joseph Telushkin wrote that the commandment is much more than a prohibition against casual interjections using God's name. He pointed out that the more literal translation of Lo tissa is "you shall not carry" rather than "you shall not take", and that understanding this helps one understand why the commandment ranks with such as "You shall not murder" and "You shall not commit adultery".

One of the first commandments listed by Maimonides in the Mishneh Torah is the responsibility to sanctify God's name. Maimonides thought the commandment should be taken as generally as possible, and therefore he considered it forbidden to mention God's name unnecessarily at any time. Jewish scholars referred to this as motzi shem shamayim lavatalah, "uttering the Name of Heaven uselessly." To avoid guilt associated with accidentally breaking the commandment, Jewish scholars applied the prohibition to all seven biblical titles of God in addition to the proper name, and established the safeguard of circumlocution when referring to the Name of God. In writing names of God, a common practice includes substituting letters or syllables so that the written word is not exactly the name, or writing the name in an abbreviated manner. Orthodox Jews will not even pronounce a name of God unless it is said in prayer or religious study. The Sacred Name (Tetragrammaton), is never pronounced by these Jews but always read as "Adonai (the Lord)," "HaShem (the Name)," or sometimes "AdoShem".

May His great Name be blessed forever and ever.

— from the Kaddish

The Kaddish is an important prayer in a Jewish prayer service whose central theme is the magnification and sanctification of God's name. Along with the Shema and Amidah, it is one of the most important and central prayers of Jewish liturgy.

== In Christianity ==
=== In the New Testament ===
In his Sermon on the Mount, Jesus taught that one's word should be reliable and that one should not swear by God or his creation. The Epistle of James reiterates to simply say 'yes' or 'no' and keep one's word, "so that you may not fall into condemnation."

According to the Applied New Testament Commentary, appeals to authorities to validate the truth of a promise had expanded in Jesus's day, which was not in line with the original commandment. Jesus is quoted as warning that they were blind and foolish who gave credibility to such arguments.

According to the Gospel of John, Jesus made appeals to the power of the name of God and also claimed the name of God as his own, which constituted blasphemy if it were not true. The Gospel of John relates an incident where a group attempts to stone Jesus after he speaks God's name. Jesus says that he is the Messiah, and makes parallels between himself and the "Son of Man" referred to by the prophet Daniel, which evokes an emphatic response that he has blasphemed (broken the commandment) and deserves death.

And Jesus came and spake unto them, saying, All power is given unto me in heaven and in earth. Go ye therefore, and teach all nations, baptizing them in the name of the Father, and of the Son, and of the Holy Ghost.

— Matthew 28:18–19 (KJV)

Paul the Apostle occasionally invokes God's name in his epistles, calling God as witness to the purity of his motives and honesty of his dealings with the churches to whom he ministered.

The author of Hebrews reviewed God's promise to Abraham as assurance that outstanding promises will yet be fulfilled. "Human beings, of course, swear by someone greater than themselves, and an oath given as confirmation puts an end to all dispute." In the case of the promise of God to Abraham, God swore by his own name to guarantee the promise, since there was nothing greater for him to swear by.

Similar to the events described in the Book of Daniel, the Book of Revelation includes a description of an angel who swears by God to the truth of the end-time events being revealed to John.

=== In the Catholic Church ===
O Lord, our Lord, how majestic is your name in all the earth!

— Psalm 8:1, Catechism of the Catholic Church 2160

The Catholic Church teaches that the Lord's name is holy and should be introduced into one's speech only to bless, praise or glorify that name. The name should be used respectfully, with an awareness of the presence of God. It must not be abused by careless speech, false oaths, or words of hatred, reproach or defiance toward God, or used in magic. Since Jesus Christ is believed to be the Messiah, and "the image of the invisible God," this commandment is applied to the name of Jesus Christ as well.

The sentiment behind this commandment is expressed in the Lord's Prayer, which begins, "Our Father who art in heaven, hallowed be thy name." According to Pope Benedict XVI, when God revealed his name to Moses he established a relationship with mankind; Benedict stated that the Incarnation was the culmination of a process that "had begun with the giving of the divine name." Benedict elaborated that this means the divine name could be misused and that Jesus' inclusion of "hallowed be thy name" is a plea for the sanctification of God's name, to "protect the wonderful mystery of his accessibility to us, and constantly assert his true identity as opposed to our distortion of it."

Taking an oath or swearing is to take God as witness to what one affirms. It is to invoke the divine truthfulness as a pledge of one's own truthfulness.

Promises made to others in God's name engage the divine honor, fidelity, truthfulness, and authority. They must be respected in justice. To be unfaithful to them is to misuse God's name and in some way to make God out to be a liar. (1 John 1:10)

— Catechism of the Catholic Church 2147

For the same reason, the Catechism of the Catholic Church teaches that it is a duty to reject false oaths that others might try to impose; an oath may be made false because it attests to a lie, because an illegitimate authority is requiring it, or because the purpose of the oath is contrary to God's law or human dignity.

=== In the Evangelical-Lutheran Churches ===
The Lutheran Witness, a magazine representing the Lutheran faith, supports the view that oaths should not generally be taken at all, except "for the glory of God and the welfare of our neighbor." Specifically, it states that proper use of God's name includes administration of oaths in court, and in swearing-in a spiritual or political leader to their respective offices, which include responsibilities toward God and fellow human beings.

=== In the Reformed Churches ===
In his Institutes of the Christian Religion, John Calvin sets the stage for discussing this commandment by noting that an oath is calling God to witness that what we say is true, and that an appropriate oath is a kind of worship of God in that it implies a profession of faith. When human testimony fails, people appeal to God as witness, as the only one able to bring hidden things to light and know what is in the heart. False swearing robs God of his truth (to the observer), and therefore it is a serious matter. With regard to the casual use of God's name, Calvin summarized, "remember that an oath is not appointed or allowed for passion or pleasure, but for necessity." He wrote that the frequency of casual use of the name of God has dulled the public conscience but that the commandment, with its penalty, still stands.

Matthew Henry described five categories of actions that constitute taking God's name in vain: 1) hypocrisy – making a profession of God's name, but not living up to that profession; 2) covenant breaking – if one makes promises to God yet does not carry out the promised actions; 3) rash swearing; 4) false swearing; and 5) using the name of God lightly and carelessly, for charms or spells, jest or sport. He pointed out that though a person may hold him/herself guiltless in one of these matters, the commandment specifically states that God will not.

=== In the Methodist Churches ===
The Holiness Methodist publication The Satisfying Portion noted that in addition to the use of profanity, individuals take the name of the Lord in vain when they sing hymns and recite Scripture without recognition of the deep meaning of the same.

=== In The Church of Jesus Christ of Latter-day Saints ===
Members of the Church of Jesus Christ of Latter-day Saints believe in this commandment as written in Exodus 20. The commandment has been repeated in the LDS Scriptures such as the Book of Mormon and in Doctrine and Covenants.

Thou shalt not take the name of the Lord thy God in vain; for the Lord will not hold him guiltless that taketh his name in vain.

— Mosiah 13:15

Keep yourselves from evil to take the name of the Lord in vain, for I am the Lord your God, even the God of your fathers, the God of Abraham and of Isaac and of Jacob.

— Doctrine and Covenants 136:21

And again, the Lord God hath commanded that men should not murder; that they should not lie; that they should not steal; that they should not take the name of the Lord their God in vain; that they should not envy; that they should not have malice; that they should not contend one with another; that they should not commit whoredoms; and that they should do none of these things; for whoso doeth them shall perish.

— 2 Nephi 26:32

The prophet and president of the Church Spencer W. Kimball told the following story to inspire believers: President Kimball underwent surgery many years ago, he was wheeled from the operating room to the intensive care room. The attendant who pushed the gurney which carried him stumbled and let out an oath using the name of the Lord. President Kimball, who was barely conscious, said weakly, "Please! Please! That is my Lord whose names you revile." There was a deathly silence; then the young man whispered with a subdued voice, "I am sorry."
