= Expletive infixation =

Process in word formation

Expletive infixation is a process by which an expletive or profanity is inserted into a word, usually for intensification. It is similar to tmesis, but not all instances are covered by the usual definition of tmesis because the words are not necessarily compounds.

The most commonly inserted English expletives are adjectival: either participles (fucking, mother-fucking, freaking, blooming, bleeding, damned, wretched) or adjectives (bloody).

== Rules of formation in English ==
Judgments of which formations of expletive infixation are acceptable are remarkably consistent. This suggests that the rules for the placement of the expletive are not arbitrary, but instead derive from fundamental aspects of English phonology.

A simple rule is that the insertion occurs at a syllable boundary, usually just before the primary stressed syllable. Thus, one hears abso-fuckin'-lutely rather than *ab-fuckin'-solutely. This rule is insufficient to describe examples such as un-fuckin'-believable, however, so that some modifications to this rule are proposed, such as morpheme boundaries taking precedence over stress. Counterexamples to this exception do exist: unbe-fuckin'-lievable.

A more fundamental theory due to John McCarthy is based on prosody. Its basic principle is that "the metrical stress tree of the host is minimally restructured to accommodate the stress tree of the infix". For example, although unbelievable and irresponsible have identical stress patterns and the first syllable of each is a separate morpheme, the preferred insertion points are different: un-fuckin'-believable, but irre-fuckin'-sponsible. McCarthy explains this by saying they have different prosodic structures: un(be((lieva)ble)) but (irre)((sponsi)ble). The infix cannot fall between the syllables ir and re because they form a single prosodic foot.

== See also ==
- Affix
