= Minced oath =

Euphemistic expression

A minced oath is a euphemistic expression formed by deliberately changing the spelling of, or replacing, part of a profane, blasphemous, or taboo word or phrase to remove the original term's objectionable characteristics. Also, a new term can be created from scratch. The goal is to create a new term that expresses the same emotions but does not carry the same offensive denotative meaning. An example is "gosh" for "God", or fudge for fuck.

Many languages have such expressions. In the English language, nearly all profanities have minced variants.

== Formation ==
Common methods of forming a minced oath are rhyme and alliteration. Thus the word bloody can become blooming or ruddy. Alliterative minced oaths such as darn for damn allow a speaker to begin to say the prohibited word and then change to a more acceptable expression. In rhyming slang, rhyming euphemisms are often truncated so that the rhyme is eliminated; prick became Hampton Wick and then simply Hampton. Another well-known example is "cunt" rhyming with "Berkeley Hunt", which was subsequently abbreviated to "berk". Alliteration can be combined with metrical equivalence, as in the pseudo-blasphemous "Judas Priest", substituted for the blasphemous use of "Jesus Christ".

Minced oaths can also be formed by shortening: e.g., b for bloody or f for fuck. Sometimes words borrowed from other languages become minced oaths; for example, poppycock comes from the Dutch pappe kak, meaning 'soft dung'. The minced oath blank is an ironic reference to the dashes that are sometimes used to replace profanities in print. It goes back at least to 1854, when Cuthbert Bede wrote, "I wouldn't give a blank for such a blank blank. I'm blank, if he doesn't look as if he'd swallowed a blank codfish." By the 1880s, it had given rise to the derived forms blanked and blankety, which combined gave the name of the long-running British TV quiz show Blankety Blank. In the same way, bleep arose from the use of a tone to mask profanities on radio.

== History ==
The Cretan king Rhadamanthus is said to have forbidden his subjects to swear by the gods, suggesting that they instead swear by the ram, the goose or the plane tree. Socrates favored the "Rhadamanthine" oath "by the dog", with "the dog" often interpreted as referring to the bright "Dog Star", i.e., Sirius. Aristophanes mentions that people used to swear by birds instead of by the gods, adding that the soothsayer Lampon still swears by the goose "whenever he's going to cheat you". Since no god was called upon, Lampon may have considered this oath safe to break.

The use of minced oaths in English dates back at least to the 14th century, when "gog" and "kokk", both euphemisms for God, were in use. Other early minced oaths include "Gis" or "Jis" for Jesus (1528).

Late Elizabethan drama contains a profusion of minced oaths, probably due to Puritan opposition to swearing. Seven new minced oaths are first recorded between 1598 and 1602, including 'sblood for "By God's blood" from Shakespeare, 'slight for "God's light" from Ben Jonson, and 'snails for "God's nails" from the historian John Hayward. Swearing on stage was officially banned by the Act to Restrain Abuses of Players in 1606, and a general ban on swearing followed in 1623. Other examples from the 1650s included 'slid for "By God's eyelid" (1598), 'sfoot for "By God's foot" (1602), and gadzooks for "By God's hooks" (referring to the nails on Christ's cross). In the late 17th century, egad meant oh God, and ods bodikins for "By God's bodkins [i.e. nail]s" in 1709. The words most commonly minced transitioned from being blasphemous to being based on bodily functions starting in the 1700s.

In some cases the original meanings of these minced oaths were forgotten; the oath 'struth (By God's truth) came to be spelled strewth. The oath Zounds and related Wounds changed pronunciation in the Great Vowel Shift, but the normal word wound did not (at least not in Received Pronunciation), so that they no longer sound like their original meaning of "By God's wounds".

== Acceptability ==
Although minced oaths are not as strong as the expressions from which they derive, some audiences may still find them offensive. One writer in 1550 considered "idle oaths" like "by cocke" (by God), "by the cross of the mouse foot", and "by Saint Chicken" to be "most abominable blasphemy". The minced oaths "'sblood" and "zounds" were omitted from the Folio edition of Shakespeare's play Othello, probably as a result of Puritan-influenced censorship. In 1941, a United States federal judge threatened a lawyer with contempt of court for using the word "darn". Zounds may sound amusing and archaic to the modern ear, yet as late as 1984 the columnist James J. Kilpatrick recalled that "some years ago", after using it in print, he had received complaints that it was blasphemous because of its origin as "God's wounds". (He had written an article entitled "Zounds! Is Reagan Mad?" in the Spartanburg Herald for 12 June 1973, and also used "zounds" in June 1970.)

== Literature and censorship ==
It is common to find minced oaths in literature and media. Writers sometimes face the problem of portraying characters who swear and often include minced oaths instead of profanity in their writing so that they will not offend audiences or incur censorship. One example is The Naked and the Dead, where publishers required author Norman Mailer to use the minced oath "fug" over his objections. Somerset Maugham referred to this problem in his novel The Moon and Sixpence (1919), in which the narrator explained that "Strickland, according to Captain Nichols, did not use exactly the words I have given, but since this book is meant for family reading, I thought it better—at the expense of truth—to put into his mouth language familiar to the domestic circle".

J. R. R. Tolkien pretends a similar mincing of profanity in The Lord of the Rings, stating in Appendix F of the novel: "But Orcs and Trolls spoke as they would, without love of words or things; and their language was actually more degraded and filthy than I have shown it. I do not suppose that any will wish for a closer rendering, though models are easy to find."

== See also ==
- Bowdlerization
- Eggcorn
- Euphemism
- Expletive deleted
- Four-letter word
- Fuddle duddle
- Hlonipha

== Works cited ==
- Hughes, Geoffrey (1991). Swearing: A Social History of Foul Language, Oaths and Profanity in English. Cambridge, MA: Blackwell. ISBN 0-631-16593-2.
- prep. by J. A. Simpson ... (1989). Oxford English Dictionary (2nd ed.). Oxford University Press. ISBN 978-0-19-861186-8.
