= Diacope =

Repetition of a word or phrase with one or a few intervening words

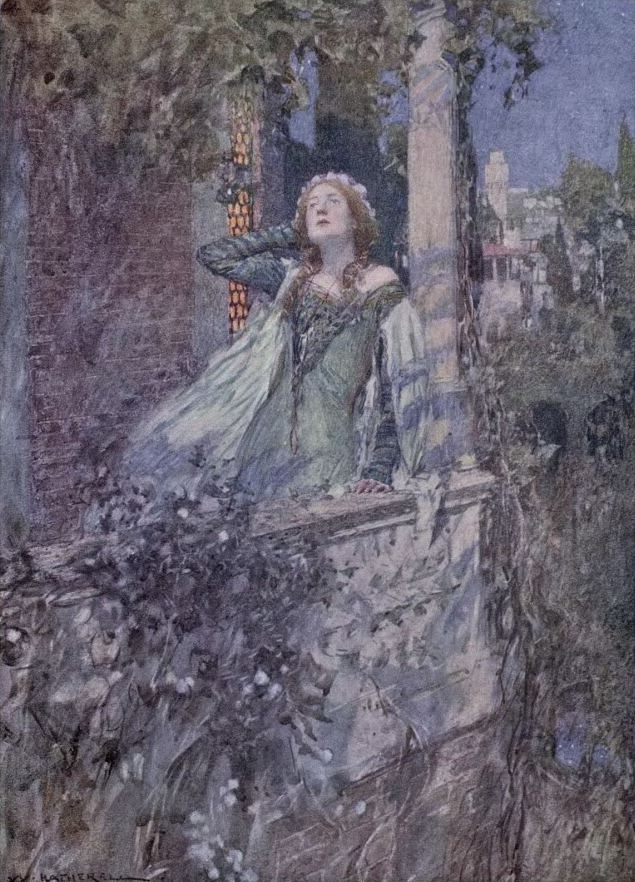
In Shakespeare's Romeo and Juliet, Juliet famously announces the following extended diacope: "O Romeo, Romeo! Wherefore art thou Romeo?"

Diacope (/daɪˈækəpi/ dy-AK-ə-pee) is a rhetorical term consisting of the repetition of a word or phrase separated up by a single intervening word or short phrase. It derives from a Greek word diakopḗ, which means "cut in two". Diacopes (or diacopae) are used for emphasis— specifically on the repeated phrase— and expressing strong emotions.

== Types of diacopes ==
There are three types of diacopes:

1. Vocative diacopes involve the intervening phrase being a noun of address; for example, "Yeah, baby, yeah" from Austin Powers (baby is vocative in this context).
2. Elaborative diacopes involve an explanatory word as part of the intervening phrase to enhance the repeated phrase's meaning; for example, the line "O Captain! My Captain!" from Walt Whitman's eponymous poem.
3. Extended diacopes involve the repeated phrase being reiterated more than twice. While non-extended diacopes take on the form ABA, extended diacopes can use other variations; many of which use the AABA form as in Juliet's soliloquy in Romeo and Juliet: "O Romeo, Romeo! Wherefore art thou Romeo?"

== Rhetorical use ==
Diacope can be used to emphasize be placed on the repeated word. Additionally, it can create strong emotional impact and sense of urgency or insistency, especially if the repeated word is emotionally impactful. For example, The Cardigans' "Lovefool's" chorus has an extended diacope— "Love me. Love me. Say that you love me—" which strengthens the listener's emotional resonance with the speaker and emphasizes the song's chorus as an increasingly-urgent plea. This can additionally be used for persuasion.

Diacopes can also provide rhythm to the text.

== Examples ==
The following are examples of vocative diacopes:

- "I am dying, Egypt, dying" — Shakespeare, Antony and Cleopatra, Act IV, Scene 15.
- "The horror! Oh, the horror!"
- "Run, Forrest, run" — Forrest Gump
- "Burn baby burn" — "Disco Inferno"

The following are examples of elaborative diacopes:

- "Bond. James Bond." — James Bond
- "Put out the light, and then put out the light." — Shakespeare, Othello, Act V, scene 2.
- "In times like these, it helps to recall that there have always been times like these." — Paul Harvey (also an example of an epanalepsis).
- "You think you own whatever land you land on" — Second verse from the song "Colors of the Wind" from the movie Pocahontas

The following are examples of extended diacopes:

- "A horse! a horse! my kingdom for a horse! — Shakespeare, Richard III
- "And we loved with a love that was more than love—I and my Annabel Lee" — Edgar Allan Poe, Annabel Lee
- "Free at last. Free at last. Thank God almighty we are free at last" — Martin Luther King, Jr., I Have a Dream speech
- "I'm thirsty, I'm thirsty! Oh, God, I'm thirsty! Oh I'm thirsty! Oh I'm thirsty! I'm thirsty! Oh, Oh, Oh, I'm thirsty!" — "The Crucifixion," Jesus Christ Superstar (this could be considered in the form AABABABAABA or alternatively as multiple diacopes)
- "Keeps going and going and going." — Energizer slogan

Leo Marks's poem "The Life That I Have", memorably used in the film Odette, is an extended example of diacope:

The life that I have
Is all that I have
And the life that I have
Is yours.

The love that I have
Of the life that I have
Is yours and yours and yours.

A sleep I shall have
A rest I shall have
Yet death will be but a pause.

For the peace of my years
In the long green grass
Will be yours and yours and yours.

The first line in the poem not to deploy diacope is the one about death being "a pause."

== See also ==
- Epizeuxis
- Tmesis
