= Interrogative =

Clause type associated with questions

An interrogative clause is a clause whose form is typically associated with question-like meanings. For instance, the English sentence "Is Hannah sick?" has interrogative syntax which distinguishes it from its declarative counterpart "Hannah is sick". Also, the additional question mark closing the statement assures that the reader is informed of the interrogative mood. Interrogative clauses may sometimes be embedded within a phrase, for example: "Paul knows who is sick", where the interrogative clause "who is sick" serves as complement of the embedding verb "know".

Languages vary in how they form interrogatives. When a language has a dedicated interrogative inflectional form, it is often referred to as interrogative grammatical mood. Interrogative mood or other interrogative forms may be denoted by the glossing abbreviation int.

== Question types ==
Interrogative sentences are generally divided between yes–no questions, which ask whether or not something is the case (and invite an answer of the yes/no type), and wh-questions, which specify the information being asked about using a word like which, who, how, etc.

An intermediate form is the choice question, disjunctive question or alternative question, which presents a number of alternative answers, such as "Do you want tea or coffee?"

Negative questions are formed from negative sentences, as in "Aren't you coming?" and "Why does he not answer?"

Tag questions are questions "tagged" onto the end of sentences to invite confirmation, as in "She left earlier, didn't she?"

Indirect questions (or interrogative content clauses) are subordinate clauses used within sentences to refer to a question (as opposed to direct questions, which are interrogative sentences themselves). An example of an indirect question is where Jack is in the sentence "I wonder where Jack is." English and many other languages do not use inversion in indirect questions, even though they would in the corresponding direct question ("Where is Jack?"), as described in the following section.

== Features ==
Languages may use both syntax and prosody to distinguish interrogative sentences (which pose questions) from declarative sentences (which state propositions). Syntax refers to grammatical changes, such as changing word order or adding question words; prosody refers to changes in intonation while speaking. Some languages also mark interrogatives morphologically, i.e. by inflection of the verb. A given language may use one or more of these methods in combination.

=== Inflection ===
Certain languages mark interrogative sentences by using a particular inflection of the verb (this may be described as an interrogative mood of the verb). Languages with some degree of this feature include Irish, Scottish Gaelic, Greenlandic, Nenets, Central Alaskan Yup'ik, Turkish, Finnish, Korean and Venetian.

In most varieties of Venetian, interrogative verb endings have developed out of what was originally a subject pronoun, placed after the verb in questions by way of inversion (see following section). For example, Old Venetian magnè-vu? ("do you eat?", formed by inversion from vu magnè "you eat") has developed into the modern magneto? or magnèu?. This form can now also be used with overt subjects: Voaltri magnèo co mi? ("do you eat with me?", literally "you eat-you with me?").

In Turkish, the verb takes the interrogative particle mı (also mi, mu, mü according to the last vowel of the word – see vowel harmony), with other personal or verbal suffixes following after that particle:

- Geliyorum. ("I am coming.") → Geliyor muyum? ("Am I coming?")
- Geliyordum. ("I was coming.") → Geliyor muydum? ("Was I coming?")
- Geldim. ("I came.") → Geldim mi? ("Did I come?")
- Evlisin. ("You are married.") → Evli misin? ("Are you married?")

In Central Alaskan Yup'ik, verbs are conjugated in what is called the interrogative mood if one wishes to pose a content question:

- Taiciquten. ("You sg. will come.") → Qaku taiciqsit? ("When (future) will you come?)
- Qimugta ner'uq neqmek. ("The dog is eating some fish.") → Camek ner'a qimugta? ("What is the dog eating?)

Yes/no questions in Yup'ik, however, are formed by attaching the enclitic -qaa to the end of the first word of the sentence, which is what is being questioned:

- Taiciquten-qaa? ("Will you come?")
- Qimugta-qaa ner'uq neqmek? ("Is the dog eating some fish?")

Further details on verb inflection can be found in the articles on the languages listed above (or their grammars).

=== Syntax ===
The main syntactic devices used in various languages for marking questions are changes in word order and addition of interrogative words or particles.

In some modern Western European languages, questions are marked by switching the verb with the subject (inversion), thus changing the canonical word order pattern from SVO to VSO. For example, in German:

- Er liebt mich. ("he loves me"; declarative)
- Liebt er mich? ("does he love me?", literally "loves he me?"; interrogative)

Similar patterns are found in other Germanic languages and French. In the case of Modern English, inversion is used, but can only take place with a limited group of verbs (called auxiliaries or "special verbs"). In sentences where no such verb is otherwise present, the auxiliary do (does, did) is introduced to enable the inversion (for details see do-support, and English grammar § Questions. Formerly, up to the late 16th century, English used inversion freely with all verbs, as German still does.) For example:

- They went away. (normal declarative sentence)
- They did go away. (declarative sentence re-formed using do-support)
- Did they go away? (interrogative formed by inversion with the auxiliary did)

An inverted subject pronoun may sometimes develop into a verb ending, as described in the previous section with regard to Venetian.

Another common way of marking questions is with the use of a grammatical particle or an enclitic, to turn a statement into a yes–no question enquiring whether that statement is true. A particle may be placed at the beginning or end of the sentence, or attached to an element within the sentence. Examples of interrogative particles typically placed at the start of the sentence include the French est-ce que and Polish czy. (The English word whether behaves in this way too, but is used in indirect questions only.) The constructed language Esperanto uses the particle ĉu, which operates like the Polish czy:

- Vi estas blua. ("You are blue.")
- Ĉu vi estas blua? ("Are you blue?")

Particles typically placed at the end of the question include Japanese か ka and Mandarin 吗 ma. These are illustrated respectively in the following examples:

- 彼は日本人です Kare wa Nihon-jin desu. ("He is Japanese.")
- 彼は日本人ですか？ Kare wa Nihon-jin desu ka? ("Is he Japanese?")
- 他是中國人 Tā shì Zhōngguórén. ("He is Chinese.")
- 他是中國人吗？ Tā shì Zhōngguórén ma? ("Is he Chinese?")

Enclitic interrogative particles, typically placed after the first (stressed) element of the sentence, which is generally the element to which the question most strongly relates, include the Russian ли li, and the Latin nē (sometimes just n in early Latin). For example:

- Tu id veritus es. ("You feared that.")
- Tu nē id veritus es? ("Did you fear that?")

This ne usually forms a neutral yes–no question, implying neither answer (except where the context makes it clear what the answer must be). However Latin also forms yes–no questions with nonne, implying that the questioner thinks the answer to be the affirmative, and with num, implying that the interrogator thinks the answer to be the negative. Examples: num negāre audēs? ("You dare not deny, do you?"; Catullus 1,4,8); Mithridātēs nōnne ad Cn. Pompeium lēgātum mīsit? ("Didn't Mithridates send an ambassador to Gnaeus Pompey?"; Pompey 16,46).

In Indonesian and Malay, the particle -kah is appended as a suffix, either to the last word of a sentence, or to the word or phrase that needs confirmation (that word or phrase being brought to the start of the sentence). In more formal situations, the question word apakah (formed by appending -kah to apa, "what") is frequently used.

- Kita tersesat lagi. ("We are lost again.") → Kita tersesat lagikah? ("Are we lost again?")
- Jawaban saya benar. ("My answer is correct.") → Benarkah jawaban saya? ("Is my answer correct?")
- Presiden sudah menerima surat itu. "The president has received the letter." → Apakah presiden sudah menerima surat itu? ("Has the president received the letter?")

For Turkish, where the interrogative particle may be considered a part of the verbal inflection system, see the previous section.

Another way of forming yes–no questions is the A-not-A construction, found for example in Chinese, which offers explicit yes or no alternatives:

- 他是中国人 Tā shì Zhōngguórén. ("He is Chinese.")
- 他不是中国人 Tā bu shì Zhōngguórén. ("He is not Chinese.")
- 他是不是中国人？ Tā shì bu shì Zhōngguórén? ("Is he Chinese?"; literally "He is, is not Chinese")

Somewhat analogous to this is the method of asking questions in colloquial Indonesian, which is also similar to the use of tag questions ("..., right?", "..., no?", "..., isn't it?", etc.), as occur in English and many other languages:

- Kamu datang ke Indonesia, tidak? ("Do you come to Indonesia?"; literally "You come to Indonesia, not?")
- Dia orang Indonesia, bukan? ("Is he Indonesian?"; literally "He is Indonesian, not?")
- Mereka sudah belajar bahasa Indonesia, belum? ("Have they learnt Indonesian?"; literally "They have learnt Indonesian, not?")

Non-polar questions (wh-questions) are normally formed using an interrogative word (wh-word) such as what, where, how, etc. This generally takes the place in the syntactic structure of the sentence normally occupied by the information being sought. However, in terms of word order, the interrogative word (or the phrase it is part of) is brought to the start of the sentence (an example of wh-fronting) in many languages. Such questions may also be subject to subject–verb inversion, as with yes–no questions. Some examples for English follow:

- You are (somewhere). (declarative word order)
- Where are you? (interrogative: where is fronted, subject and verb are inverted)
- He wants (some book). (declarative)
- What book does he want? (interrogative: what book is fronted, subject and verb are inverted, using do-support)

However wh-fronting typically takes precedence over inversion: if the interrogative word is the subject or part of the subject, then it remains fronted, so inversion (which would move the subject after the verb) does not occur:

- Who likes chips?
- How many people are coming?

Not all languages have wh-fronting (and as for yes–no questions, inversion is not applicable in all languages). In Mandarin, for example, the interrogative word remains in its natural place (in situ) in the sentence:

- 你要什麼？ Nǐ yào shénme? ("what do you want", literally "you want what?")

This word order is also possible in English: "You did what?" (with rising intonation). (When there is more than one interrogative word, only one of them is fronted: "Who wants to order what?") It is also possible to make yes–no questions without any grammatical marking, using only intonation (or punctuation, when writing) to differentiate questions from statements – in some languages this is the only method available. This is discussed in the following section.

=== Intonation and punctuation ===
Questions may also be indicated by a different intonation pattern. This is generally a pattern of rising intonation. It applies particularly to yes–no questions; the use of rising question intonation in yes–no questions has been suggested to be one of the universals of human languages. With wh-questions, however, rising intonation is not so commonly used – in English, questions of this type usually do not have such an intonation pattern.

The use of intonation to mark yes–no questions is often combined with the grammatical question marking described in the previous section. For example, in the English sentence "Are you coming?", rising intonation would be expected in addition to the inversion of subject and verb. However it is also possible to indicate a question by intonation alone. For example:

- You're coming. (statement, typically spoken with falling intonation)
- You're coming? (question, typically spoken with rising intonation)

A question like this, which has the same form (except for intonation) as a declarative sentence, is called a declarative question. In some languages this is the only available way of forming yes–no questions – they lack a way of marking such questions grammatically, and thus do so using intonation only. Examples of such languages are Italian, Modern Greek, Portuguese, and the Jakaltek language. Similarly in Spanish, yes–no questions are not distinguished grammatically from statements (although subject–verb inversion takes place in wh-questions).

On the other hand, it is possible for a sentence to be marked grammatically as a question, but to lack the characteristic question intonation. This often indicates a question to which no answer is expected, as with a rhetorical question. It occurs often in English in tag questions, as in "It's too late, isn't it?" If the tag question ("isn't it") is spoken with rising intonation, an answer is expected (the speaker is expressing doubt), while if it is spoken with falling intonation, no answer is necessarily expected and no doubt is being expressed.

Sentences can also be marked as questions when they are written down. In languages written in Latin or Cyrillic, as well as certain other scripts, a question mark at the end of the sentence identifies it as a question. In Spanish, an additional inverted mark is placed at the beginning (e.g.¿Cómo está usted?). Question marks are also used in declarative questions, as in the example given above (in this case they are equivalent to the intonation used in speech, being the only indication that the sentence is meant as a question). Question marks are sometimes omitted in rhetorical questions (the sentence given in the previous paragraph, when used in a context where it would be spoken with falling intonation, might be written "It's too late, isn't it.", with no final question mark).

== Responses ==
Responses to questions are often reduced to elliptical sentences rather than full sentences, since in many cases only the information specially requested needs to be provided. (See Answer ellipsis.) Also many (but not all) languages have words that function like the English 'yes' and 'no', used to give short answers to yes–no questions. In languages that do not have words compared to English 'yes' and 'no', e.g. Chinese, speakers may need to answer the question according to the question. For example, when asked 喜歡喝茶嗎？ (Do you like tea?), one has to answer 喜歡 (literally 'like') for affirmative or 不喜歡 (literally 'not like') for negative. But when asked 你打籃球嗎？ (Do you play basketball?), one needs to answer 我打 (literally 'I play') for affirmative and 我不打 (literally 'I don't play') for negative. There is no simple answering word for 'yes' and 'no' in Chinese. One needs to answer the yes–no question using the main verb in the question instead.

Responses to negative interrogative sentences can be problematic. In English, for example, the answer "No" to the question "You don't have a passport?" may confirm the negative, i.e. it means that the responder does not have a passport, but on the other hand, it can also imply that the responder does have a passport. Most often, a native speaker would also state an indicative sentence for clarification, i.e. "No, I don't have a passport," or even "No, I do have a passport," the latter most likely being used if the question were phrased, "Do you not have a passport?" which would connote serious doubt. However, in some other languages, such as Japanese, a negative answer to a negative question asserts the affirmative – in this case that the responder does have a passport. In English, "Yes" would most often assert the affirmative, though a simple, one-word answer could still be unclear, while in some other languages it would confirm the negative without doubt.

Some languages have different words for "yes" when used to assert an affirmative in response to a negative question or statement; for example the French si, the German doch, and Danish, Swedish or Norwegian jo.

Ambiguity may also arise with choice questions. A question like "Do you like tea or coffee?" can be interpreted as a choice question, to be answered with either "tea" or "coffee"; or it can be interpreted as a yes–no question, to be answered "yes (I do like tea or coffee)" or "no (I do not like tea or coffee)".
