= Yes/no question =

Type of close-ended question

In linguistics, a yes/no question, also known as a binary question, a polar question, or a general question, is a closed-ended question whose expected answer is one of two options; one that provides either an affirmative or negative answer to the question. Typically, the choice is between "yes" and "no" in English. Yes–no questions present an exclusive disjunction, namely a pair of alternatives of which only one is a felicitous answer. In English, such questions can be formed in both positive and negative forms:

- positive yes/no question: "Will you be here tomorrow?"
- negative yes/no question: "Won't you be here tomorrow?"

Yes–no questions are in contrast with non-polar wh-questions. The latter are also called content questions, and are formed with the five Ws plus an H ("who", "what", "where", "when", "why", "how"). Rather than restricting the range of possible answers to two alternatives, content questions are compatible with a broad range of alternative answers. For example, questions beginning with "who", involve a set of several alternatives, from which one is to be drawn; in this respect, they are open-ended questions. In contrast, yes–no questions are closed-ended questions, as they only permit one of two answers, namely "yes" or "no".

== Grammatical form ==
Yes–no questions take many forms cross-linguistically. Many languages mark them with word order or verb morphology. Others use question particles or question intonation. These strategies are often mixed and matched from language to language.

=== Esperanto ===
In Esperanto, the word "ĉu" added to the beginning of a statement makes it a polar question.

Esperanto	Translation
Vi estas blua.	You are blue.
Ĉu vi estas blua?	Are you blue?

=== Germanic languages ===
In Germanic languages, yes–no questions are marked by word order. The following Dutch example shows how questions can be formed using subject inversion.

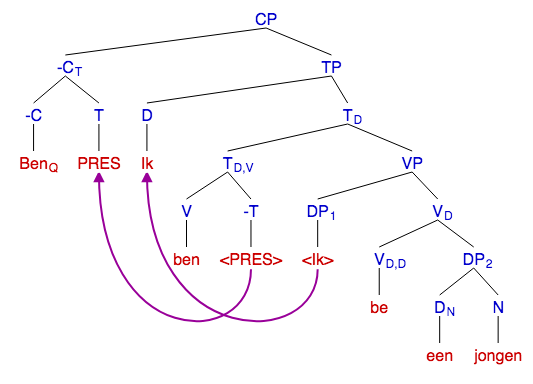
Example in Dutch of subject verb inversion from a statement to a yes–no question

Dutch	Translation
Ik ben een jongen	I am a boy.
Ben ik een jongen?	Am I a boy?

=== Hindi-Urdu ===
In Hindi-Urdu (Hindustani), yes–no questions have rising intonation on the verbal complex, whereas declaratives generally have falling intonation. Unlike English, they do not involve inversion of the finite verb. Yes–no questions optionally co-occur with the wh-word क्या (kyā) [PQP – polar question particle]. The presence of the polar particle क्या (kyā) does not make the characteristic prosody optional.

क्या राज-ने उमा-को किताब दी↑
kyā rāj-ne umā-ko kitāb dī↑
what.PQP raj:MASC.SG.ERG uma:FEM.SG.DAT book.FEM.SG.NOM give:PRF.3SG.FEM
'Did Raj give a/the book to Uma?'

*क्या राज-ने उमा-को किताब दी↓
*kyā rāj-ne umā-ko kitāb dī↓
what.PQP raj:MASC.SG.ERG uma:FEM.SG.DAT book.FEM.SG.NOM give:PRF.3SG.FEM
intendedː 'Did Raj give a/the book to Uma?'

राज-ने उमा-को क्या दिया↓?
rāj-ne umā-ko kyā diyā↓?
raj:MASC.SG.ERG uma:FEM.SG.DAT what give:PRF.3SG.MASC
'What did Raj give to Uma?'

In the sentences (A) and (B) above, क्या (kyā) is not the argument of any predicate and hence acts as a yes–no question particle. But क्या (kyā) can also function as an argument of a predicate with the meaning ‘what’ as shown in (C)

The question particle क्या (kyā) has a flat intonation while the thematic क्या (kyā) has a pitch accent, which also appears more generally on wh-phrases in Hindi. The most unmarked location for polar-question particle क्या (kyā) is the clause-initial position. But it can appear in almost any other position. It can be clause-medial or clause-final. In an almost mirror image pattern, thematic क्या (kyā) "what", is natural in the immediately preverbal position but odd/marked elsewhere. In casual use, the "yes or no" question marker (in the sense of "is it that") is usually dropped as intonation is usually sufficient.

(क्या) राज-ने (क्या) उमा-को (क्या) किताब (*क्या) दी (क्या)?
(kyā) rāj-ne (kyā) umā-ko (kyā) kitāb (*kyā) dī (kyā)?
what.PQP raj:MASC.SG.ERG what.PQP uma:FEM.SG.DAT what.PQP book.FEM.SG.NOM what give:PRF.3SG.FEM what.PQP
'Did Raj give a/the book to Uma?'

(*क्या) राज-ने (*क्या) उमा-को क्या दिया (*क्या)?
(*kyā) rāj-ne (*kyā) umā-ko kyā diyā (*kyā)?
what.PQP raj:MASC.SG.ERG what.PQP uma:FEM.SG.DAT what give:PRF.3SG.MASC what.PQP
'What did Raj give Uma?'

Some example sentences with varied positions of the yes–no particle are shown in the table below:

Questions	Transliteration	Literal	Translation
तेरा नाम राज है ?	terā nām rāj hai?	your name Raj is?	"Is your name Raj?"
क्या तेरा नाम राज है ?	kyā terā nām rāj hai?	what your name Raj is?	"Is your name Raj?"
तेरा क्या नाम राज है ?	terā kyā nām rāj hai?	your what name Raj is?	"Is your name Raj?"
तेरा नाम क्या राज है ?	terā nām kyā rāj hai?	your name what Raj is?	"Is your name Raj?"
तेरा नाम राज क्या है ?	terā nām rāj kyā hai?	your name Raj what is?	"What is your name 'Raj'?"
तेरा नाम राज है क्या ?	terā nām rāj hai kyā?	your name Raj is what?	"Is your name Raj?"

Note: क्या (kyā) can only be interpreted as "what" in the second last sentence in the table above.

=== Japanese ===
In Japanese, the response to a negative yes/not question is opposite to that of English. For example, asking "Won't you be here tomorrow?" (明日ここにいないですか?) the response would be “Yes” (はい) if the respondent wished to agree that they will not be there tomorrow, and “No” (いいえ) if the respondent wished to disagree and say that they will be there tomorrow.

A question is formed by appending the particle か to a statement, as shown in the table below.

Japanese	Translation
(私は) 男です。	I am a man.
(私は) 男ですか?	Am I a man?

=== Latin ===
In Latin, the enclitic particle -ne (sometimes just "-n" in Old Latin) can be added to the emphatic word to turn a declarative statement into a yes–no question. It usually forms a neutral yes–no question, implying neither answer (except where the context makes it clear what the answer must be). For example:

Latin	Translation
Tu id veritus es.	"You feared that."
Tu-nē id veritus es?	"Did you fear that?"

Yes–no questions are also formed in Latin using the word "nonne" to imply that the interrogator thinks the answer to be the affirmative and with "num" to imply that the interrogator thinks the answer to be the negative. For example:

num negāre audēs?

("You dare not deny, do you?")

— Catullus, 1,4,8

Mithridātēs nōnne ad Cn. Pompeium lēgātum mīsit?

("Didn't Mithridates send an ambassador to Gnaeus Pompey?")

— Pompey, 16,46

=== Mandarin ===
In Chinese, yes–no questions typically take an A-not-A form. The resulting response is usually an echo response.

=== Russian ===
In Russian, the word “li” acts as an unambiguous signal to a yes–no question interrogative.

Kupila li Maša knigu?
bought li Masha.NOM book.ACC
“Did Masha buy a book?”

Intonation is also another way that makes a declarative sentence into an interrogative sentence.

Maša KUPILA knigu?
Masha.NOM bought book.ACC

Meaning "Did Masha buy a book? Did she really buy it?" I.e., the focus of the question is on the action, implying, depending on context, "She didn't forget to buy the book, did she?" or "Did she buy it, not borrowed or something?", etc.

Maša kupila KNIGU?
Masha.NOM bought book.ACC

In (2a) there are no particular context requirement, but the finite verb is the position of the pitch accent. For (2b), there is no particular context as well, but the sentence-final internal argument is where the focus is. With this accent the question is interpreted as (depending on context) "Was it a book that Masha bought?" or "Did Masha buy a book? A book? Really?"

(2c) MAŠA kupila knigu?

The accent on the first word implies the meaning "Was it Masha who bought the book?"

== Ambiguities ==
There is an ambiguity in English as to whether certain questions actually are yes–no questions in the first place. Syntactically identical questions can be semantically different. It can be seen by considering the following ambiguous example:

- Did John play chess or checkers?

The question could be a yes–no question or could be an alternative question.

Possible ways to reply to this question:

- “Yes, John did” or “No, John did not”— The respondent assumed a straightforward yes–no question, whether John played either of the games
- “Chess” or “Checkers”— The respondent assumed it is asking the alternative question (which does not have a yes–no response) of which of the two game John played (with the presumption that he played one or the other), to which the answer is the name of the game.

Another such ambiguous question is "Would you like an apple or an orange?" to which the responses can be "An apple", "An orange", "Yes", and "No", depending from whether the question is seen as an alternative question or a yes–no question. (The "yes." answer involves a further ambiguity, discussed below.)

A related ambiguity is questions with the form of yes–no questions but intended not to be. They are a class of questions that encompass indirect speech acts. The question "Can you reach the mustard?" is an example. In form and semantics, it is a straightforward yes–no question, which can be answered either "Yes, I can" or "No, I cannot". There is, however, an indirect speech act (which Clark calls an elective construal) that can optionally be inferred from the question, namely "please pass the mustard". Such indirect speech acts flout Grice's maxim of manner. The inference on the part of the listener is optional, one that can legitimately remain untaken.

Clark describes one study where a researcher telephoned fifty restaurants around Palo Alto, California, asking without embellishment the question "Do you accept credit cards?" The three forms of reply given were:

- "Yes, we do." – The respondent assumed a straightforward yes–no question, taking the form of the question at face value.
- "Yes, we accept Mastercard and Visa." – The respondent assumed a straightforward yes–no question but provided additional information, either as explanation ("The answer is 'yes' because we accept these two.") or as anticipation or inference of a further request as to what credit cards are accepted.
- "We accept Mastercard and Visa." – The respondent not only took the question to be the indirect speech act but also assumed that the question was not a yes–no question, despite its form and so did not provide a yes–no answer at all.

Another part of the same study was the question "Do you have a price on a fifth of Jim Beam?" Out of 100 merchants, 40 answered "Yes". A non-response bias forced researchers to disregard the survey question asking tobacconists "Do you have Prince Albert?" as although the researchers' intent was to observe whether the merchants specified that they offered the tobacco brand as packaged in a can and/or a pouch, the merchants frequently hung up the phone, presumably because they believed themselves to be the victims of a popular prank call.

== Answers ==
According to Grimes, the answer "yes" asserts a positive answer and the answer "no" asserts a negative answer, irrespective of the form of the question. However, simple "yes" or "no" word sentence answers to yes–no questions can be ambiguous in English. For example, a "yes" response to the question "You didn't commit the crime?" could mean either "yes, I didn't commit the crime" or "yes, I did commit the crime" depending from whether the respondent is replying with the truth-value of the situation or to the polarity used in the question. The ambiguity does not exist in languages that employ echo answers. In the Welsh language, for example, the response "ydw" ("I am") has no such ambiguity when it is used to reply to a question.

Other languages also do not follow the custom, given by Grimes, with respect to the answers "yes" and "no". In New Guinea Pidgin, Polish and Huichol, the answer given has the logical polarity implied by the form of the question.

- Positive form: "Bai Renjinal i ranewe, o nogat?" (“Will Reginald escape?”)
- Possible Answers: “Yes” (agreement, he will escape) or nogat (disagreement, he will not escape).

However in the negative form, the senses of the answers take the opposite polarity to English, following instead of the polarity of the question.

- Negative form: "Bai Rejinal i no ranewe, o nogat?" ("Won't Reginald escape?")
- Possible Answers: “Yes” (agreement, he will not escape) or nogat (disagreement, he will escape)

A further ambiguity with yes–no questions, in addition to that of polarity, is the ambiguity of whether an exclusive or inclusive disjunction is meant by the word "or", as it can represent either. Conventionally, in English yes–no questions the "or" represents an exclusive disjunction. However, as with the "Would you like an apple or an orange?" question mentioned earlier, to which one possible answer, as a yes–no question, is "yes.", yes–no questions can also be taken to be inclusive disjunctions. The informativeness of the "or" in the question is low, especially if the second alternative in the question is "something" or "things". The "exclusive" and "inclusive" can be determined often in spoken language (the speaker will often lower their pitch at the end of an "exclusive" question, as opposed to raising it at the end of an "inclusive" question), but it is a frequent source of humour for computer scientists and others familiar with Boolean logic, who will give responses such as "yes" to questions such as "Would you like chicken or roast beef for dinner?". However, the ambiguity is not confined to humour. The apple-or-orange question may be legitimately asking whether either is wanted, for example, and "Would you like an apple or something?" is indeed expecting either "yes" or "no" as a proper answer rather than the answer "Something" that an exclusive disjunction would be requesting.

This ambiguity does not exist only in English. It exists in West Greenlandic Kalaallisut, for example. The question Maniitsu-mi Nuum-mi=luunniit najugaqar-pa ("Does he live in Maniitsoq or Nuuk?") is ambiguous as to whether exclusive or inclusive disjunction is meant. Commonly, this is clarified either by intonation (if the question is spoken) or the inclusion of an explicit question-word such as sumi ("where").

== Suggestibility ==
Yes–no questions are believed to carry some suggestibility load. For instance, in response to yes–no questions, children tend to display a compliance tendency: they comply with the structure of the question, negative or positive, by responding in the same way.

For example, if preschoolers are asked of a pen, "Is this for writing?", they will tend to respond "Yes, it is". But if they are asked, "Is this not made of wood?" they are more likely to say, "No, it is not".

== See also ==
- A-not-A question
- Closed-ended question
- Coercive logic
- Decision problem
- Filler (linguistics)
- Mu (negative)
- Rising declarative
- Yes, no, black, white, a game where players must avoid saying "yes" or "no", even in response to yes–no questions
