= Yes and no =

Words of affirmation (yes) and negation or contradiction (no)

Yes and no, or similar word pairs, are expressions of the affirmative and the negative, respectively, in several languages, including English. Some languages make a distinction between answers to affirmative versus negative questions and may have three-form or four-form systems. English originally used a four-form system up to and including Early Middle English. Modern English uses a two-form system consisting of yes and no. It exists in many facets of communication, such as: eye blink communication, head movements, Morse code, and sign language. Some languages, such as Latin, do not have yes–no word systems.

Answering a "yes or no" question with single words meaning yes or no is by no means universal. About half the world's languages typically employ an echo response: repeating the verb in the question in an affirmative or a negative form. Some of these also have optional words for yes and no, like Hungarian, Russian, and Portuguese. Others simply do not have designated yes and no words, like Welsh, Irish, Latin, Thai, and Chinese. Echo responses avoid the issue of what an unadorned yes means in response to a negative question. Yes and no can be used as responses to a variety of situations – but are better suited in response to simple questions. While a yes response to the question "You don't like strawberries?" is ambiguous in English, the Welsh response ydw ('I do.'; lit. 'I am.') has no ambiguity.

The words yes and no are not easily classified into any of the conventional parts of speech. Sometimes they are classified as interjections. They are sometimes classified as a part of speech in their own right, sentence words, or pro-sentences, although that category contains more than yes and no, and not all linguists include them in their lists of sentence words. Yes and no are usually considered adverbs in dictionaries, though some uses qualify as nouns. Sentences consisting solely of one of these two words are classified as minor sentences.

== In English ==
=== Classification ===
Although sometimes classified as interjections, these words do not act as calls for attention; they are not adverbs because they do not qualify any verb, adjective, or adverb. They are sometimes classified as a part of speech in their own right: sentence words or word sentences.

This is the position of Otto Jespersen, who states that "'Yes' and 'No' ... are to all intents and purposes sentences just as much as the most delicately balanced sentences ever uttered by Demosthenes or penned by Samuel Johnson."

Georg von der Gabelentz, Henry Sweet, and Philipp Wegener have all written on the subject of sentence words. Both Sweet and Wegener include yes and no in this category, with Sweet treating them separately from both imperatives and interjections, although Gabelentz does not.

Watts classifies yes and no as grammatical particles, in particular response particles. He also notes their relationship to the interjections oh and ah, which is that the interjections can precede yes and no but not follow them. Oh as an interjection expresses surprise, but in the combined forms oh yes and oh no merely acts as an intensifier; but ah in the combined forms ah yes and ah no retains its stand-alone meaning, of focusing upon the previous speaker's or writer's last statement. The forms *yes oh, *yes ah, *no oh, and *no ah are grammatically ill-formed. Aijmer similarly categorizes the yes and no as response signals or reaction signals.

Felix Ameka classifies these two words in different ways according to the context. When used as back-channel items, he classifies them as interjections; but when they are used as the responses to a yes–no question, he classifies them as formulaic words. The distinction between an interjection and a formula is, in Ameka's view, that the former does not have an addressee (although it may be directed at a person), whereas the latter does. The yes or no in response to the question is addressed at the interrogator, whereas yes or no used as a back-channel item is a feedback usage, an utterance that is said to oneself. However, Sorjonen criticizes this analysis as lacking empirical work on the other usages of these words, in addition to interjections and feedback uses.

Bloomfield and Hockett classify the words, when used to answer yes–no questions, as special completive interjections. They classify sentences comprising solely one of these two words as minor sentences.

Sweet classifies the words in several ways. They are sentence-modifying adverbs, adverbs that act as modifiers to an entire sentence. They are also sentence words, when standing alone. They may, as question responses, also be absolute forms that correspond to what would otherwise be the not in a negated echo response. For example, a "No." in response to the question "Is he here?" is equivalent to the echo response "He is not here." Sweet observes that there is no correspondence with a simple yes in the latter situation, although the sentence-word "Certainly." provides an absolute form of an emphatic echo response "He is certainly here." Many other adverbs can also be used as sentence words in this way.

Unlike yes, no can also be an adverb of degree, applying to adjectives solely in the comparative (e.g., no greater, no sooner, but not no soon or no soonest), and an adjective when applied to nouns (e.g., "He is no fool." and Dyer's "No clouds, no vapours intervene.").

Grammarians of other languages have created further, similar, special classifications for these types of words. Tesnière classifies the French oui and non as phrasillons logiques (along with voici). Fonagy observes that such a classification may be partly justified for the former two, but suggests that pragmatic holophrases is more appropriate.

=== The Early English four-form system ===
While Modern English has a two-form system of yes and no for affirmatives and negatives, earlier forms of English had a four-form system, comprising the words yea, nay, yes, and no. Yes contradicts a negatively formulated question, No affirms it; Yea affirms a positively formulated question, Nay contradicts it.

- Will they not go? — Yes, they will.
- Will they not go? — No, they will not.
- Will they go? — Yea, they will.
- Will they go? — Nay, they will not.

This is illustrated by the following passage from Much Ado about Nothing:

Claudio: Can the world buie such a iewell? [buy such a jewel]
Benedick: Yea, and a case to put it into, but speake you this with a sad brow?

— William Shakespeare, Much Ado about Nothing, Act I, Scene I

Benedick's answer of yea is a correct application of the rule, but as observed by W. A. Wright "Shakespeare does not always observe this rule, and even in the earliest times the usage appears not to have been consistent." Furness gives as an example the following, where Hermia's answer should, in following the rule, have been yes:

Demetrius: Do not you thinke, The Duke was heere, and bid vs follow him?
Hermia: Yea, and my Father.

— William Shakespeare, A Midsummer Night's Dream

This subtle grammatical feature of Early Modern English is recorded by Sir Thomas More in his critique of William Tyndale's translation of the New Testament into Early Modern English, which was then quoted as an authority by later scholars:

I would not here note by the way that Tyndale here translateth no for nay, for it is but a trifle and mistaking of the Englishe worde : saving that ye shoulde see that he whych in two so plain Englishe wordes, and so common as in naye and no can not tell when he should take the one and when the tother, is not for translating into Englishe a man very mete. For the use of these two wordes in aunswering a question is this. No aunswereth the question framed by the affirmative. As for ensample if a manne should aske Tindall himselfe: ys an heretike meete to translate Holy Scripture into Englishe ? Lo to thys question if he will aunswere trew Englishe, he must aunswere nay and not no. But and if the question be asked hym thus lo: is not an heretike mete to translate Holy Scripture into Englishe ? To this question if he will aunswere trewe Englishe, he must aunswere no and not nay. And a lyke difference is there betwene these two adverbs ye and yes. For if the question bee framed unto Tindall by the affirmative in thys fashion. If an heretique falsely translate the New Testament into Englishe, to make his false heresyes seem the word of Godde, be his bokes worthy to be burned ? To this questyon asked in thys wyse, yf he will aunswere true Englishe, he must aunswere ye and not yes. But now if the question be asked him thus lo; by the negative. If an heretike falsely translate the Newe Testament into Englishe to make his false heresyee seme the word of God, be not hys bokes well worthy to be burned ? To thys question in thys fashion framed if he will aunswere trewe Englishe he may not aunswere ye but he must answere yes, and say yes marry be they, bothe the translation and the translatour, and al that wyll hold wyth them.

— Thomas More, The Confutation of Tyndale's Answer, pp. 430

In fact, More's exemplification of the rule actually contradicts his statement of what the rule is. This went unnoticed by scholars such as Horne Tooke, Robert Gordon Latham, and Richard Chenevix Trench, and was first noted by George Perkins Marsh in his Lectures on the English Language, where he points out that More's incorrect statement of the first rule, "No aunswereth the question framed by the affirmative," is immediately contradicted by More himself in the very next sentence in which he gives an example of a question framed affirmatively and gives the answer as "nay": "[Y]s an heretike mete to translate holy scripture into englishe? Lo to this question if he will aunswere trew englishe he must aunswere nay and not no." That even More got the rule wrong, even while himself dressing down Tyndale for getting it wrong, is seen by Marsh as evidence that the four word system was "too subtle a distinction for practice".

Marsh found no evidence of a four-form system in Mœso-Gothic, although he reported finding "traces" in Old English. He observed that in the Anglo-Saxon Gospels,

- positively phrased questions are answered positively with gea (John 21:15,16, King James Version: "Jesus saith to Simon Peter, Simon, son of Jonas, lovest thou me more than these? He saith unto him, Yea, Lord; thou knowest that I love thee" etc.)
- and negatively with ne (Luke 12:51, KJV: "Suppose ye that I am come to give peace on earth? I tell you, Nay; but rather division"; 13:4,5, KJV: "Or those eighteen, upon whom the tower in Siloam fell, and slew them, think ye that they were sinners above all men that dwelt in Jerusalem? I tell you, Nay: but, except ye repent, ye shall all likewise perish."), nese (John 21:5 "Then Jesus saith unto them, Children, have ye any meat? They answered him, No."; Matthew 13:28,29, KJV: "The servants said unto him, Wilt thou then that we go and gather them up? But he said, Nay; lest while ye gather up the tares, ye root up also the wheat with them."), and nic meaning 'not I' (John 18:17, KJV: "Then saith the damsel that kept the door unto Peter, Art not thou also one of this man's disciples? He saith, I am not.");
- while negatively phrased questions are answered positively with gyse (Matthew 17:25, KJV: "they that received tribute money came to Peter, and said, Doth not your master pay tribute? He saith, Yes.")
- and negatively for example with nā, meaning 'no one' (John 8:10,11, "he said unto her, Woman, where are those thine accusers? hath no man condemned thee? She said, No man, Lord.").

Marsh calls this four-form system of Early Modern English a "needless subtlety". Tooke called it a "ridiculous distinction", with Marsh concluding that Tooke believed Thomas More to have simply made this rule up and observing that Tooke is not alone in his disbelief of More. Marsh, however, points out (having himself analyzed the works of John Wycliffe, Geoffrey Chaucer, John Gower, John Skelton, and Robert of Gloucester, and Piers Plowman and Le Morte d'Arthur) that the distinction both existed and was generally and fairly uniformly observed in Early Modern English from the time of Chaucer to the time of Tyndale. But after the time of Tyndale, the four-form system was rapidly replaced by the modern two-form system. The Oxford English Dictionary says the four-form system "was usually considered to be... proper..." until about 1600, with citations from Old English (mostly for yes and yea) and without any indication that the system had not yet started then.

=== Colloquial forms ===
==== Non-verbal ====
Linguist James R. Hurford notes that in many English dialects "there are colloquial equivalents of Yes and No made with nasal sounds interrupted by a voiceless, breathy h-like interval (for Yes) or by a glottal stop (for No)" and that these interjections are transcribed into writing as uh-huh or mm-hmm. These forms are particularly useful for speakers who are at a given time unable to articulate the actual words yes and no. The use of short vocalizations like uh-huh, mm-hmm, and yeah are examples of non-verbal communication, and in particular the practice of backchanneling.

==== Aye and variants ====
The word aye (/aɪ/) as a synonym for yes in response to a question dates to the 1570s. According to the Online Etymology Dictionary, it is of unknown origin. It may derive from the word I (in the context of "I assent"); as an alteration of the Middle English yai ("yes"); or the adverb aye (meaning always "always, ever"), which comes from the Old Norse ei. Using aye to mean yes is archaic, having disappeared from most of the English-speaking world, but is notably still used by people from parts of Wales, Scotland, Northern Ireland and Northern England, and (rarely) the Isle of Man in the UK, and in other parts of Ulster in Ireland.

In December 1993, a witness in a court in Stirlingshire, Scotland, answered "aye" to confirm he was the person summoned, but was told by a sheriff judge that he must answer either yes or no, or else be held in contempt of court. When asked if he understood, he replied "aye" again, and was imprisoned for 90 minutes for contempt of court. On his release he said, "I thought I was answering him."

Aye is also a common word in parliamentary procedure, where the phrase the ayes have it means that a motion has passed. In the House of Commons of the British Parliament, MPs vote orally by saying "aye" or "no" to indicate they approve or disapprove of the measure or piece of legislation. (In the House of Lords, by contrast, members say "content" or "not content" when voting).

The term has also historically been used in nautical usage, often phrased as "aye, aye, sir" duplicating the word "aye". Fowler's Dictionary of Modern English Usage (1926) explained that the nautical phrase was at that time usually written ay, ay, sir.

The informal, affirmative phrase why-aye (also rendered whey-aye or way-eye) is used in the dialect of northeast England, most notably by Geordies.

In New England English, chiefly in Maine, ayuh is used; also variants such as eyah, ayeh or ayup. It is believed to be derived from either the nautical or Scottish use of aye.

==== Other ====
Other variants of "yes" include acha in informal Indian English and historically righto or righty-ho in upper-class British English, although these fell out of use during the early 20th century.

== Three-form systems ==
Several languages have a three-form system, with two affirmative words and one negative. In a three-form system, the affirmative response to a positively phrased question is the unmarked affirmative, the affirmative response to a negatively phrased question is the marked affirmative, and the negative response to both forms of question is the (single) negative. For example, in Norwegian the affirmative answer to "Snakker du norsk?" ("Do you speak Norwegian?") is "Ja", and the affirmative answer to "Snakker du ikke norsk?" ("Do you not speak Norwegian?") is "Jo", while the negative answer to both questions is "Nei".

Danish, Swedish, Norwegian, Icelandic, Faroese, Hungarian, German, Dutch, French, Malayalam, and Farsi all have three-form systems.

Language	'Yes' to affirmative question	'Yes' to negative question	'No'
Swedish, Danish	ja	jo	nej
Norwegian	ja	jo/jau	nei
Icelandic	já	jú	nei
Faroese	ja	jú	nei
Hungarian	igen	de	nem
German	ja	doch	nein
Dutch	ja	jawel	nee
French	oui	si	non
Malayalam	അതേ (athe)	ഉവ്വ് (uwa)	ഇല്ല (illa)
Farsi	بله (baleh)	چرا (chera)	نه (na)

Swedish, and to some extent Danish and Norwegian, also have additional forms javisst and jovisst, analogous to ja and jo, to indicate a strong affirmative response. Swedish (and Danish and Norwegian slang) also have the forms joho and nehej, which both indicate stronger response than jo or nej. Jo can also be used as an emphatic contradiction of a negative statement.

Malayalam has the additional forms അതേല്ലോ (athello), ഉവ്വല്ലോ (uvvallo) and ഇല്ലല്ലോ (illallo), which act like question words, question tags, or to strengthen the affirmative or negative response, indicating stronger meaning than അതേ, ഉവ്വ് and ഇല്ല (athe, uvvu and illa). The words അല്ലേ (alle), ആണല്ലോ (aanallo), അല്ലല്ലോ (allallo), വേണല്ലോ (venallo), വേണ്ടല്ലോ (vendallo), ഉണ്ടല്ലോ (undallo) and ഇല്ലേ (ille) work in the same ways. These words are considered more polite than a curt "No!" or "Yes!". ഉണ്ട (unda) means "it is there" and the word behaves as an affirmative response like അതേ (athe). The usage of ഏയ് (aayu) to simply mean "No" or "No way!" is informal and may be casual or sarcastic, while അല്ല (alla) is the more formal way of saying "false", "incorrect" or that "it is not" and is a negative response for questions. The word അല്ലല്ല (allalla) has a stronger meaning than അല്ല (alla). ശരി (shari) is used to mean "OK" or "correct", with the opposite ശരിയല്ല (shariyala) meaning "not OK" or "not correct". It is used to answer affirmatively to questions to confirm any action by the asker, but to answer negatively one says വേണ്ടാ (venda). വേണം (venam) and വേണ്ട (venda) both mean "to want" and "not to want".

== Other languages with four-form systems ==
Like Early Modern English, the Romanian language has a four-form system. The affirmative and negative responses to positively phrased questions are da and nu, respectively. But in responses to negatively phrased questions they are prefixed with ba (i.e. ba da and ba nu). nu is also used as a negation adverb, infixed between subject and verb. Thus, for example, the affirmative response to the negatively phrased question "N-ai plătit?" ("Didn't you pay?") is "Ba da." ("Yes."—i.e. "I did pay."), and the negative response to a positively phrased question beginning "Se poate să ...?" ("Is it possible to ...?") is "Nu, nu se poate." ("No, it is not possible."—note the use of nu for both no and negation of the verb.)

== Related words in other languages and translation problems ==
=== Finnish ===
Finnish does not generally answer yes–no questions with either adverbs or interjections but answers them with a repetition of the verb in the question, negating it if the answer is the negative. (This is an echo response.) The answer to Tuletteko kaupungista? ("Are you coming from town?") is the verb form itself, Tulemme. ("We are coming.") However, in spoken Finnish, a simple "Yes" answer is somewhat more common, Joo.

Negative questions are answered similarly. Negative answers are just the negated verb form. The answer to Tunnetteko herra Lehdon? ("Do you know Mr Lehto?") is En tunne. ("I don't know.") or simply En. ("I don't."). However, Finnish also has particle words for "yes": Kyllä (formal) and joo (colloquial). A yes–no question can be answered "yes" with either kyllä or joo, which are not conjugated according to the person and plurality of the verb. Ei, however, is always conjugated and means "no".

=== Latvian ===
Up until the 16th century Latvian did not have a word for yes and the common way of responding affirmatively to a question was by repeating the question's verb, just as in Finnish. The modern day jā was borrowed from Middle High German ja and first appeared in 16th-century religious texts, especially catechisms, in answers to questions about faith. At that time such works were usually translated from German by non-Latvians that had learned Latvian as a foreign language. By the 17th century, jā was being used by some Latvian speakers that lived near the cities, and more frequently when speaking to non-Latvians, but they would revert to agreeing by repeating the question verb when talking among themselves. By the 18th century the use of jā was still of low frequency, and in Northern Vidzeme the word was almost non-existent until the 18th and early 19th century. Only in the mid-19th century did jā really become usual everywhere.

=== Welsh ===
It is often assumed that Welsh has no words at all for yes and no. It has ie and nage, and do and naddo. However, these are used only in specialized circumstances and are some of the many ways in Welsh of saying yes or no. Ie and nage are used to respond to sentences of simple identification, while do and naddo are used to respond to questions specifically in the past tense. As in Finnish, the main way to state yes or no, in answer to yes–no questions, is to echo the verb of the question. The answers to "Ydy Ffred yn dod?" ('Is Ffred coming?') are either "Ydy" ('He is (coming).') or "Nac ydy" ('He is not (coming)'). In general, the negative answer is the positive answer combined with nag. For more information on yes and no answers to yes–no questions in Welsh, see Jones, listed in further reading.

=== Latin ===
Latin has no single words for yes and no. Their functions as word sentence responses to yes–no questions are taken up by sentence adverbs, single adverbs that are sentence modifiers and also used as word sentences. There are several such adverbs classed as truth-value adverbs—including certe, fortasse, nimirum, plane, vero, etiam, sane, videlicet, and minime (negative). They express the speaker's/writer's feelings about the truth value of a proposition. They, in conjunction with the negator non, are used as responses to yes–no questions. For example:

"Quid enim diceres? Damnatum? Certe non." ("For what could you say? That I had been condemned? Assuredly not.")

— Cicero, Dom. 51

Latin also employs echo responses.

=== Galician and Portuguese ===
These languages have words for yes and no, namely si and non in Galician and sim and não in Portuguese. However, answering a question with them is less idiomatic than answering with the verb in the proper conjugation.

=== Spanish ===
In Spanish, the words sí 'yes' and no 'no' are unambiguously classified as adverbs: serving as answers to questions and also modifying verbs. The affirmative sí can replace the verb after a negation (Yo no tengo coche, pero él sí = I don't own a car, but he does) or intensify it (I don't believe he owns a car. / He does own one! = No creo que él tenga coche. / ¡Sí lo tiene!). The word no is the standard adverb placed next to a verb to negate it (Yo no tengo coche = I don't own a car). Double negation is normal and valid in Spanish, and it is interpreted as reinforcing the negation (No tengo ningún coche = I own no car).

=== Nepali ===
In Nepali, there is no one word for yes and no as it depends upon the verb used in the question. The words most commonly translated as equivalents are हो (ho; lit. 'is') and होइन (hoina; lit. 'not is') are in fact the affirmative and negative forms of the same verb हो (ho; lit. 'is') and hence is only used when the question asked contains said verb. In other contexts, one must repeat the affirmative or negative forms of the verb being asked, for instance तिमीले खाना खायौँ? (timīle khānā khāyau?; lit. 'You food ate?') would be answered by खाएँ (khāe˜; lit. 'ate'), which is the verb 'to eat' conjugated for the past tense first person singular. In certain contexts, the word नाई (nāī) can be used to deny something that is stated, for instance politely passing up an offer.

=== Chinese ===
Speakers of Chinese use echo responses. In all Sinitic/Chinese languages, yes–no questions are often posed in A-not-A form, and the replies to such questions are echo answers that echo either A or not A. In Standard Mandarin Chinese, the closest equivalents to yes and no are to state 是 (shì; lit. 'is') and 不是 (búshì; lit. 'not is'). The phrase 不要 (búyào; lit. '(I) do not want') may also be used for the interjection no, and 嗯 (ǹg) may be used for yes. Similarly, in Cantonese, the preceding are 係 (hai6; lit. 'is') and 唔係 (m4 hai6; lit. 'not is'), respectively. One can also answer 冇錯 (mou5 co3; lit. 'not wrong') for the affirmative, although there is no corresponding negative to this.

=== Japanese ===
The Japanese words for yes and no, はい (hai) and いいえ (iie), work differently than in English. Hai is often used to simply acknowledge hearing the question, prior to answering it. On their own, hai and iie signify agreement or disagreement with the proposition put by the question. This is especially clear in answers to negative questions: if asked, "Are you not going?" (行かないのですか?, ikanai no desu ka?), answering with the affirmative hai would mean "Right, I am not going"; whereas in English, answering "yes" would be to contradict the negative question.

Nevertheless, echo responses are typical in Japanese.

=== Polish ===
In Polish, the words for yes and no are tak and nie, respectively. Formally speaking, they signify agreement or disagreement with the proposition put by the question, as in Japanese. However, it is common to simply use tak and nie to give affirmative and negative responses, as in English. Double negation is normal and valid in Polish, and it is interpreted as reinforcing the negation, e.g. nie mam nic (lit. 'I don't have nothing') meaning 'I don't have anything' or 'I have nothing'.

=== Complications ===
These differences between languages make translation difficult. No two languages are isomorphic at the most elementary level of words for yes and no. Translation from two-form to three-form systems are equivalent to what English-speaking school children learning French or German encounter. The mapping becomes complex when converting two-form to three-form systems. There are many idioms, such as reduplication (in French, German, and Italian) of affirmatives for emphasis (the Dutch and German ja ja ja).

The mappings are one-to-many in both directions. The German ja has no fewer than 13 English equivalents that vary according to context and usage (yes, yeah, and no when used as an answer; well, all right, so, and now, when used for segmentation; oh, ah, uh, and eh when used an interjection; and do you, will you, and their various inflections when used as a marker for tag questions) for example. Moreover, both ja and doch are frequently used as additional particles for conveying nuanced meaning where, in English, no such particle exists. Straightforward, non-idiomatic, translations from German to English and then back to German can often result in the loss of all of the modal particles such as ja and doch from a text.

Translation from languages that have word systems to those that do not, such as Latin, is similarly problematic. As Calvert says, "Saying yes or no takes a little thought in Latin".

== See also ==
- Affirmation and negation
- Thumb signal
- Translation
- Untranslatability
