= Echo answer =

Way of answering a yes/no question

In linguistics, an echo answer or echo response is a way of answering a polar question without using words for yes and no. The verb used in the question is simply echoed in the answer, negated if the answer has a negative truth-value. For example:

- "Did you go to the cinema?" (or "Didn't you go to the cinema?")
- "I did not." or "I didn't go."

== Finnish ==
The Finnish language employs echo answers in response to yes–no questions. It does not answer them with either adverbs or interjections. So the answer to "Tuletteko kaupungista?" ("Are you coming from town?") is the verb form itself, "Tulemme" ("We are coming."). Negatively phrased questions are answered similarly. Negative answers use the negative verb en in coordination with the infinitive. The negative answer to "Tunnetteko herra Lehdon?" ("Do you know Mr Lehto?") is "En tunne" ("I don't know.") or simply "En" ("I don't.").

== Celtic languages ==
The Celtic languages also primarily employ echo answers. Irish and Scottish Gaelic lack the words "yes" and "no" altogether. In Welsh, the words for "yes" and "no" ("ie" and "nage") are restricted to specialized circumstances. Like Finnish, the main way in these languages to state yes or no, to answer yes–no questions, is to echo the verb of the question. In Irish, the question "An dtiocfaidh tú?" ("Will you come?") will be answered with "Tiocfaidh mé" ("I will come") or "Ní thiochfaidh mé" ("I will not come"). (In Hiberno-English, it is the auxiliary that is echoed: the English question "Will you come?" is often answered in Ireland with "I will" instead of "Yes" or "I will not" instead of "no".)

Similarly, in Welsh, the answers to "Ydy Fred yn dod?" ("Is Fred coming?") are "Ydy" ("He is") or "Nag ydy" ("He is not"). In general, the negative answer is the positive answer combined with "nag". As in Finnish, it avoids the issue of what an unadorned "yes" means in response to a negative question. A "yes" response to the question "You don't beat your wife?" is ambiguous in English, but the Welsh response "nag ydw" has no ambiguity.

== Hebrew ==
In Biblical Hebrew echo answers are the standard way to answer yes-no questions. For example:

וַיִּקְרְאוּ לְרִבְקָה וַיֹּאמְרוּ אֵלֶיהָ, הֲתֵלְכִי עִם־הָאִישׁ הַזֶּה; וַתֹּאמֶר, אֵלֵךְ.

Then they called Rebekah and said to her, “Will you go with this man?” And she said, “I will go.”

— Genesis 24:58, with translation of the New American Standard Version

== Latin ==
Although Latin has words or phrases that can stand in for "yes" and "no", it also employs echo answers. Echo answers would be the more common and neutral response:

- Nōnne Sextus molestus discipulus est?
  "Sextus is an annoying student, isn't he?"
- Est.
  "He is."
- Num Sextus litterās memoriā tenēre potest?
  "Sextus cannot remember the alphabet, can he?"
- Nōn potest.
  "He cannot."

== Portuguese ==
The Portuguese language is the only major Romance language to use echo answers often, even though it has words for "yes" and "no" (sim and não, respectively). Portuguese speakers may most commonly answer a polar question in the affirmative by repeating the main verb.

For example, one would answer the question, "Tens fome?" ("Are you hungry?" literally, "Do you have hunger?") by simply replying, "tenho" ("I have"). One could also add sim before or after the verb for the use of emphasis or to contradict a negative question, producing "sim, tenho" or "tenho sim". To produce a negative answer to a polar question, the verb is preceded by não, optionally repeated after the verb for emphasis. Thus, a negative answer to our above question would be: "Não tenho," "Não tenho, não," or "Não tenho fome."

== Nepali ==
Unlike other Indo-Aryan languages, in Nepali there is no one word for 'yes' and 'no' as it depends upon the verb used in the question. Generally, with the exception of certain situational words, Nepali employs echo answers to respond to yes-no questions. The words "yes" and "no" in English are most commonly translated as 'हो' (ho; lit. '"is"') and 'होइन' (hoina; lit. '"not is"') are in fact the affirmative and negative forms of the same verb 'हो' (ho; lit. '"is"') and hence is only used when the question asked contains said verb. In other contexts, one must repeat the affirmative or negative forms of the verb being asked, for instance "तिमीले खाना खायौँ?" (timīle khānā khāyau?; lit. '"You food ate?"') would be answered by "खाएँ" (khāe˜; lit. '"ate"'), which is the verb "to eat" conjugated for the past tense first person singular. In certain contexts, the word "नाई" (nāī) can be used to deny something that is stated, for instance politely passing up an offer.

== Chinese ==
Chinese languages often employ echo answers. Often, yes–no questions in Mandarin are expressed in the A-not-A form, and are answered with either A or not-A. For example, where Q stands for question, A for affirmative, and N for negative:

Q: 你要不要吃桔子？ Nǐ yào bú yào chī júzi? ("You want or not want eat orange?")

- A: 要。 Yào. ("Want.")
- N: 不要。 Bú yào. ("Not want.")

Q: 他在不在慢跑？ Tā zài bú zài màn pǎo? ("He is or not jog?")

- A: 在(慢跑)。 zài (màn pǎo). ("Is (jog).")
- N: 不在(慢跑)。 Bu zài (màn pǎo) ("Not is (jog).")

In addition, yes–no questions are often formed by adding the particle "吗" (ma for "yes or no?") to the end of a sentence, in which case the answer can be "是的" (shì de for "is (so)") or "不是" (bu shì for "not is (so)"), or "对" (duì for "right") or "不对" (bu duì for "not right"):

Q: 你不上课吗？ Nǐ bu shàng kè ma? ("You not go-to class yes-or-no?")

- A: 对。 Duì. ("Right.") or 是的。 Shì de. ("Is (so).")
- N: 不对。 Bu duì. ("Not right.") or 不是。 Bu shì. ("Not is (so).")

== See also ==
- Yes–no question
- Yes and no
