= Closed-ended question =

Questions with fixed responses available

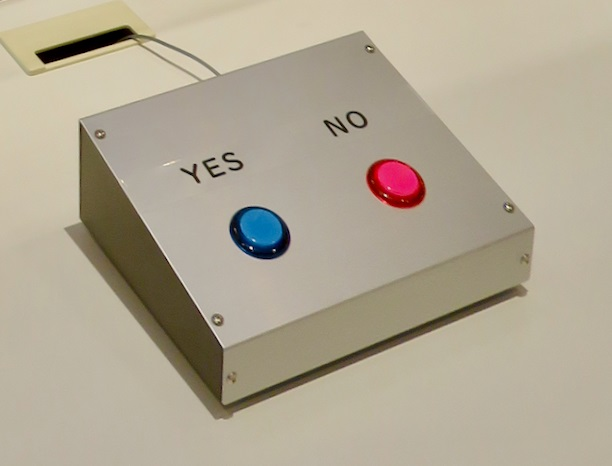
Sometimes, only two responses are possible.

A closed-ended question is any question for which a researcher provides research participants with options from which to choose a response. Closed-ended questions are sometimes phrased as a statement that requires a response.

A closed-ended question contrasts with an open-ended question, which cannot easily be answered with specific information.

== Examples ==
Examples of closed-ended questions that may elicit a "yes" or "no" response include:

- Were you born in 2010?
- Is Lyon the capital of France?
- Did you steal the money?

Similarly, variants of the above closed-ended questions that possess specific responses are:

- On what day were you born? ("Saturday.")
- What is the capital of France? ("Paris.")
- Where did you steal the money from? ("The bank.")

At the same time, there are closed-ended questions that are sometimes impossible to answer correctly with a yes or no without confusion, for example: "Have you stopped taking heroin?" (if you never took it) or "Who told you to take heroin?"; see "loaded question" and "leading question".

A study by the University of Cincinnati found 20 to 40 percent of Americans will provide an opinion when they do not have one because of social pressure, using context clues to select an answer they believe will please the questioner. A classic example of this phenomenon was the 1947 study of the fictional Metallic Metals Act.

== Alternative formulations ==
There are alternative names for the same concept. There is an entry in "A Dictionary of Psychology – Oxford Reference" for "closed question" for the concept described here. A Google trends search shows "closed question" is a more commonly searched term than "close ended question" and "closed-ended question". Statistics from "ngram" show "closed question" appears twice as frequently as "closed-ended question" in books.

== In education ==
Some in the field of education argue that closed-ended questions are, broadly speaking, "bad" questions. They are questions that are often asked to obtain a specific answer and are therefore good for testing knowledge. It is often argued that open-ended questions (i.e. questions that elicit more than a yes/no answers) are preferable because they open up discussion and enquiry.

Peter Worley argues that this is a false assumption. This is based on Worley's central arguments that there are two different kinds of open and closed questions: grammatical and conceptual. He argues that educational practitioners should be aiming for questions that are "grammatically closed, but conceptually open". For example, in standard parlance, "Is it ever right to lie?" would be regarded as a closed question: it elicits a yes–no response. Significantly, however, it is conceptually open. Any initial yes–no answer to it can be "opened up" by the questioner ("Why do you think that?", "Could there be an instance where that's not the case?"), inviting elaboration and enquiry.

This grammatically closed but cognitively open style of questioning, Worley argues, "gives [educators] the best of both worlds: the focus and specificity of a closed question (this, after all, is why teachers use them) and the inviting, elaborating character of an open question". Closed questions, simply require "opening up" strategies to ensure that conceptually open questions can fulfil their educational potential.

Worley's structural and semantic distinction between open and closed questions is integral to his pedagogical invention "Open Questioning Mindset" (OQM). OQM refers to the development, in educators, of an open attitude towards the process of learning and the questioning at the heart of that process. It is a mind-set that is applicable to all subject areas and all pedagogical environments. Teachers who develop an Open Questioning Mindset listen openly for the cognitive content of students' contributions and look for ways to use what is given for learning opportunities, whether right, wrong, relevant or apparently irrelevant. OQM encourages a style of pedagogy that values genuine enquiry in the classroom. It provides teachers with the tools to move beyond what Worley calls "guess what's in my head" teaching, that relies on closed and leading questions.

== See also ==
- A-not-A question
- Multiple choice
- Test (student assessment)
