= Untranslatability =

Text with no adequate translation

Untranslatability is the property of text or speech for which no equivalent can be found when translated into another (given) language. A text that is considered to be untranslatable is called a lacuna, or lexical gap. The term arises when describing the difficulty of achieving the so-called perfect translation. It is based on the notion that there are certain concepts and words that are so interrelated that an accurate translation becomes an impossible task.

Some writers have suggested that language carries sacred notions or is intrinsic to national identity. Brian James Baer posits that untranslatability is sometimes seen by nations as proof of the national genius. He quotes Alexandra Jaffe: "When translators talk about untranslatable, they often reinforce the notion that each language has its own 'genius', an 'essence' that naturally sets it apart from all other languages and reflects something of the 'soul' of its culture or people".

A translator, however, can resort to various translation procedures to compensate for a lexical gap. From this perspective, untranslatability does not carry deep linguistic relativity implications. Meaning can virtually always be translated, if not always with technical accuracy.

== Theories ==
There is a school of thought identified with Walter Benjamin that identifies the concept of "sacred" in relation to translation, and this pertains to the text that is untranslatable because its meaning and letter cannot be disassociated. It stems from the view that translation should realize the imagined perfect relationship with the original text. This theory highlights the paradoxical nature of translation wherein it—as a process—assumes the forms of necessity and impossibility at the same time. This is demonstrated in Jacques Derrida's analysis of the myth of Babel, a word which he described as a name that means confusion and also a proper name of God. Furthermore, Derrida noted that when God condemned the world to a multiplicity of tongues, he created a paradoxical need and impossibility of translation.

Derrida himself put forward his own notion of the untranslatability of the text, arguing in his early works such as the Writing and Difference and Margins of Philosophy that there is an excess of untranslatable meaning in literature, and it cannot be reduced to a closed system or a restricted economy "in which there is nothing that cannot be made to make sense."

Brian James Baer posits that untranslatability is sometimes seen by nations as proof of their national genius. Literature that can be easily translated may be considered as lacking originality, while translated works themselves may be regarded merely as imitations. Baer quotes Jean-Jacques Rousseau defining true genius as "the kind that creates and makes everything out of nothing". Paraphrasing Robert Frost's remark about poetry ("Poetry is what gets lost in translation"), Baer suggests that "one could define national identity as that which is lost in translation". He further quotes Alexandra Jaffe: "When translators talk about untranslatable, they often reinforce the notion that each language has its own 'genius', an 'essence' that naturally sets it apart from all other languages and reflects something of the 'soul' of its culture or people".

Quite often, a text or utterance that is considered to be "untranslatable" is called a lacuna, or lexical gap. That is, there is no one-to-one equivalence between the word, expression or turn of phrase in the source language and another word, expression or turn of phrase in the target language. A translator can, however, resort to a number of translation procedures to compensate for this. From this perspective, untranslatability or difficulty of translation does not always carry deep linguistic relativity implications; denotation can virtually always be translated, given enough circumlocution, although connotation may be ineffable or inefficient to convey.

== Examples ==
=== Register ===
Although Thai has words that can be used as equivalent to English "I", "you", or "he/she/it", they are relatively formal terms (or markedly informal). In most cases, Thai people use words which express the relation between speaker and listener according to their respective roles. For instance, for a mother to say to her child "I'll tell you a story", she would say "แม่จะเล่านิทานให้ลูกฟัง" (mae ja lao nitaan hai luuk fang), or "Mother will tell child a story". Similarly, older and younger friends will often use sibling terminology, so that an older friend telling a younger friend "You're my friend" would be "น้องเป็นเพื่อนพี่" (nawng pen peuan pii), would translate directly as "Younger sibling is older sibling’s friend". To be translated into English correctly, it is proper to use "I" and "you" for these example statements, but normal Thai perceptions of relation are lost in the process.

A similar feature can also be observed in Indonesian. One may use the formal form of pronouns, which are generally distinct from the informal/familiar forms; however, the use of these pronouns does not evoke sufficient friendliness or intimacy, especially in spoken language. Instead of saying "Anda mau pesan apa?", a waiter/waitress will most likely say "Bapak/Ibu mau pesan apa?" (lit. 'Father/Mother wants to order what?'). The two expressions are equally polite; however, the latter is more sympathetic and friendly. When conversing with family and relatives, most Indonesians also prefer using kinship terminology (father, mother, brother, sister) when addressing older family members. When addressing younger family members, informal pronouns are more prevalent.

=== Verb forms ===
English lacks some grammatical categories which are present in some other languages.

There is no simple way in English to contrast Finnish kirjoittaa or Polish pisać (continuing, corresponding to English 'to write') with kirjoitella or pisywać (a regular frequentative, 'to occasionally write short passages at a time', or 'to jot down now and then'). Similarly, hypätä and skoczyć (to jump once) contrast with hyppiä and skakać (to continuously jump; to be jumping from point A to B).

Irish allows the prohibitive mood to be used in the passive voice. The effect is used to prohibit something while expressing society's disapproval for that action at the same time. For example, contrast Ná caithigí tobac (meaning 'Don't smoke' when said to more than one person), which uses the second person plural in the imperative meaning "Do not smoke", with Ná caitear tobac (best translated as 'Smoking just isn't done here'), which uses the autonomous imperative meaning 'One does not smoke'.

Italian has three distinct declined past tenses: thus fui (passato remoto), ero (imperfetto), and sono stato (passato prossimo) all mean 'I was'. The first indicates a concluded action in the (remote) past, the second a progressive or habitual action in the past, and the latter an action that holds some connection to the present, especially if a recent time is specified ("stamattina ho visto" for 'this morning I saw'). The passato remoto is often used for narrative history (for example, novels). Nowadays, the difference between passato remoto and passato prossimo is blurred in the spoken language, the latter being used in both situations. What difference there exists is partly geographic. In the north of Italy the passato remoto is very rarely used in everyday speech, whereas in the south it often takes the place of the passato prossimo. The distinction is only alive in Tuscany, which makes it dialectal even if hardline purists insist it should be applied consistently.

Likewise, English lacks a productive grammatical means to show indirection but must instead rely on periphrasis, that is the use of multiple words to explain an idea. Finnish grammar, on the contrary, allows the regular production of a series of verbal derivatives, each of which involves a greater degree of indirection. For example, on the basis of the verb vetää ('to pull'), it is possible to produce:

- vetää (pull),
- vedättää (cause something/someone to pull/to wind-up (lie)),
- vedätyttää (cause something/someone to cause something/someone to pull),
- vedätätyttää (cause something/someone to cause something/someone to cause something/someone to pull).

Finnish	English	Translation/paraphrase of boldface verb
Hevonen **vetää.**	A horse **pulls.**	pulls
Ajomies **vedättää.**	A driver **commands** the horse **to pull**.	causes something to pull
Urakoitsija **vedätyttää.**	A subcontractor **directs** the driver **to command** the horse **to pull**.	causes someone to cause something to pull
Yhtiö **vedätätyttää.**	The corporation **assigns** the subcontractor **to have** the driver **command** the horse **to pull**.	causes someone to cause someone to cause something to pull

Hindi has a similar concept of indirection. Karna means 'to do'; karāna means 'to make someone do'; karwāna means 'to get someone to make yet another person do'.

Most Turkic languages (Turkish, Azeri, Kazakh) contain the grammatical verb suffix miş (or mis in other dialects), which indicates that the speaker did not witness the act personally but surmises or has discovered that the act has occurred or was told of it by another, as in the example of Gitmiş! (Turkish), which can be expressed in English as "it is reported that he/she/it has gone", or, most concisely, as "apparently, he/she/it has gone". This grammatical form is especially used when telling jokes, or narrating stories.

Similar to the Turkic miş, nearly every Quechua sentence is marked by an evidential clitic, indicating the source of the speaker's knowledge (and how certain they are about the statement). The enclitic =mi expresses personal knowledge (Tayta Wayllaqawaqa chufirmi, "Mr. Huayllacahua is a driver - I know it for a fact"); =si expresses hearsay knowledge (Tayta Wayllaqawaqa chufirsi, "Mr. Huayllacahua is a driver, or so I've heard"); =chá expresses high probability (Tayta Wayllaqawaqa chufirchá, "Mr. Huayllacahua is a driver, most likely"). Colloquially, the latter is also used when the speaker has dreamed the event told in the sentence or experienced it while intoxicated.

Languages that are extremely different from each other, like English and Chinese, need their translations to be more like adaptations. Chinese has no tenses per se, only three aspects. The English verb "to be" does not have a direct equivalent in Chinese. In an English sentence where "to be" leads to an adjective ("It is blue"), there is no "to be" in Chinese. (There are no adjectives in Chinese, instead there are stative verbs that do not need an extra verb.) If it states a location, the verb zài (在) is used, as in "We are in the house". In some other cases (usually when stating a judgement), the judgment verb shì (是) is used, as in "I am the leader." And in most other cases, such structure ("to be") is simply not used, but some more natural structure in Chinese is used instead. Any sentence that requires a play on those different meanings will not work the same way in Chinese. In fact, very simple concepts in English can sometimes be difficult to translate, for example, there is no single direct translation for the word "yes" in Chinese, as in Chinese the affirmative is said by repeating the verb in the question. ("Do you have it?" "(I) have".)

=== Vocabulary ===
German, Dutch, and Danish have a wealth of modal particles that are particularly difficult to translate as they convey sense or tone rather than strictly grammatical information. The most infamous example perhaps is doch (Dutch: toch, Danish: dog), which roughly means "Don't you realize that . . . ?" or "In fact it is so, though someone is denying it." What makes translating such words difficult is their different meanings depending on intonation or the context.

A common use of the word doch can be found in the German sentence Der Krieg war doch noch nicht verloren, which translates to The war wasn't lost yet, after all or The war was still not lost.

Several other grammatical constructs in English may be employed to translate these words for each of their occurrences. The same Der Krieg war doch noch nicht verloren with slightly changed pronunciation can also mean excuse in defense to a question: . . . but the war was not lost yet (. . . so we fought on).

A use which relies heavily on intonation and context could produce yet another meaning: "So the war was really not over yet (as you have been trying to convince me all along)."

Another change of intonation makes the sentence a question. Der Krieg war doch noch nicht verloren? would translate into "(You mean) the war was not yet lost (back then)?"

Similar difficulties occur with the Dutch words "even", "toch", and, especially, "gezellig".

Another well-known example comes from the Portuguese or Spanish verbs ser and estar, both being translatable as to be (see Romance copula). Ser is used with essence or nature, while estar is used with ephemeral (temporary or current), states or conditions, however. Sometimes this information is not very relevant for the meaning of the whole sentence and the translator will ignore it, whereas at other times it can be retrieved from the context.

When none of these apply, the translator usually uses a paraphrase or simply adds words that can convey the right meaning. The following example comes from Portuguese:

"Não estou bonito, sou bonito."
Spanish equivalent:"No estoy guapo; soy guapo."
Literal translation: "I am not (apparently/just right now) handsome; I am (essentially/always) handsome."
Adding words: "I am not just handsome today; I am always handsome."
Paraphrase: "I don't look handsome; I am handsome."

Some South Slavic words that have no English counterparts are doček, a gathering organized at someone's arrival (the closest translation would be greeting or welcome, although a 'doček' is not necessarily positive); and limar, a sheet metal worker.

==== Family ====
Kinship terminology often varies across languages. Terms are often too specific or too general to translate into another language. Some rules used for defining kinship terminology include the following:

Paternal or maternal. For example, Nordic languages, Indo-Aryan languages, and Chinese languages distinguish paternal and maternal relatives such as paternal grandmother and maternal grandmother. Conversely, son's son and daughter's son are also distinguished (instead of grandson). Also distinguished maternally and paternally, aunts and uncles are further distinguished in many languages (compare to non-specific-sided great aunt and great uncle).

Gender. Whereas English kinship terms make clear distinction between genders (i.e., brother, sister), many languages do not. For example, Thai does not distinguish between siblings by gender, but only by age: พี่ (phī̀, /pʰîː/) for big brother/sister, and น้อง (n̂xng, /nɔ́ːŋ/) for little brother/sister. Thai also only distinguishes the gender of the older sibling for aunts and uncles (four distinct words: mother's vs father's younger sibling and parent's older brother vs sister), and has one word for all nieces, nephews, and grandchildren. On the flip side, the English word cousins does not distinguish gender, but many languages do, including Romance languages, Slavic languages, and Chinese languages.

By blood or by marriage. For example, the English word uncle can refer to a parent's brother, or a husband of a parent's sibling. Many languages, such as Hindi, Bengali, Hungarian, and Chinese distinguish these. This is also true for Latin where e.g. avunculus refers to one's mother's brother, but cannot refer to one's mother's sister's husband, named thus materterae maritus (the husband of the maternal aunt).

Full or half sibling. In Arabic, "brother" is often translated into أخ (Akh). However, whilst this word may describe a brother who shares either one or both parents, there is a separate word - شقيق (Shaqīq) - to describe a brother with whom one shares both parents.

Age relative to oneself or one's parent. For example in Bengali, father's elder brothers are called Jethu (জ্যাঠা), while the father's younger brothers are called Kaku (কাকু). Their wives are called Jethi-ma (জেঠি-মা) and Kaki-ma (কাকি-মা), respectively. Another common issue is translating brother or sister into Chinese or Japanese, which have separate words for older and younger ones.

Relations by marriage. There is no standard English word for the Italian "consuoceri", Yiddish "makhatunim", Greek "συμπέθεροι/συμπεθερές", Latin "consocer", Spanish "consuegros" or Portuguese "consogros": a gender-neutral collective plural like "co-in-laws". If Harry marries Sally, then in Yiddish, Harry's father is the "mekhutn" of Sally's father; each mother is the "makheteyneste" of the other. In Romanian, they are "cuscri". In Bengali, both fathers are beayi and mothers, beyan. Bengali has dada/bhai for brother and jamai-babu/bhagni-pati for brother-in-law; chhele for son and jamai for son-in-law.

Spanish and Portuguese contrast "brother" with "brother-in-law" ("hermano/irmão", "cuñado/cunhado"); "son" with "son-in-law" ("hijo/filho", "yerno/genro"), and similarly for female relatives like "sister-in-law" ("cuñada/cunhada") and "daughter-in-law" ("nuera/nora"). Both languages use "concuño" (Sp.) or "concuñado/concunhado" (varying by dialect), as the relationship between two men that marry siblings (or two women, using the feminine "concuñada/concunhada" instead). In the English language this relationship would be lumped in with "cuñado/cunhado" (sibling's husband or spouse's brother) as simply "brother-in-law". This distinction is reflected also in Italian, with fratello for a brother, cognato for a brother in law; etc. In Latin, the distinction between children and children-in-law is also present, with filius for one's child, privignus for one's spouse's child that is not ours, gener (and nurus in feminine) for one's child's spouse.

Serbian and Bosnian have specific terms for relations by marriage. For example, a "sister-in-law" can be a "snaha/snaja" (brother's wife, though also family-member's wife in general), "zaova" (husband's sister), "svastika" (wife's sister) or "jetrva" (husband's brother's wife). A "brother-in-law" can be a "zet" (sister's husband, or family-member's husband in general), "djever/dever" (husband's brother), "šurak/šurjak" (wife's brother) or "badžanak/pašenog" (wife's sister's husband). Likewise, the term "prijatelj" (same as "makhatunim" in Yiddish, which also translates as "friend") is also used. Bengali has a number of in-law words. For example, Boudi (elder brother's wife), Shaali (wife's sister), Shaala (wife's younger brother), Sambandhi (wife's elder brother/Shaali's husband), Bhaasur (husband's elder brother), Deor (husband's younger brother) Nanad (husband's sister), Jaa (husband's brother's wife), etc. This is also true for Latin, with words such as levir (husband's brother), glos (husband's sister), ianitrix (husband's brother's wife), yet none for the wife's part of the family tree.

In Russian, fifteen different words cover relations by marriage, enough to confuse many native speakers. There are for example, as in Yiddish, words like "сват" and "сватья" for "co-in-laws". To further complicate the translator's job, Russian in-laws may choose to address each other familiarly by these titles.

In contrast to all of the above fine distinctions, in American English the term "my brother-in-law" covers "my spouse's brother", "my sibling's husband", and "my spouse's sibling's husband", which is six different possibilities at minimum. In British English, the last of these is not considered strictly correct.

==== Work and school relations ====
Japanese has a concept, amae, about the closeness of parent-child relationship, that is supposedly unique to that language and culture as it applies to bosses and workers.

Japanese, Chinese, and Korean have words for classmates and colleagues of different seniority and/or gender. The most well-known example to English speakers is probably the Japanese word 先輩 (senpai), referring to a senior classmate or colleague.

There are also times when the same concept exists but the practice is different, such as homeschooling in Spanish and its practice in the United States, Puerto Rico, and Latin American countries. Translators must discern whether the existing terms convey the same concepts.

==== Foreign objects ====
Objects unknown to a culture can actually be easy to translate. For example, in Japanese, wasabi わさび is a plant (Wasabia japonica) used as a spicy Japanese condiment. Traditionally, this plant only grows in Japan. It would be unlikely that someone from a country such as Angola would have a clear understanding of it. However, the easiest way to translate this word is to borrow it. Or one can use a similar vegetable's name to describe it. In English this word is translated as wasabi or Japanese horseradish. In Chinese, people can still call it wasabi by its Japanese sound, or pronounce it by its Hanzi characters, 山葵 (pinyin: shān kuí). However, wasabi is more frequently called 芥末 (jiè mò) or 绿芥 (lǜ jiè) in China and Taiwan, meaning mustard. One may specify yellow mustard and green mustard to avoid confusion.

Another method is using description instead of a single word. For example, languages like Russian and Ukrainian have borrowed words Kuraga and Uruk from Turkic languages. While both fruits are now known to the Western world, there are still no terms for them in English. English speakers have to use "dried apricot without core" and "dried apricot with core" instead.

One particular type of foreign object that poses difficulties is the proper noun. As an illustration, consider another example from Douglas Hofstadter, which he published in one of his "Metamagical Themas" columns in Scientific American. He pondered the question: "Who is the first lady of Britain? Well, first ladies reside at the prime minister's address, and at the time, the woman living at 10 Downing Street was Margaret Thatcher. But a different attribute that first ladies have is that they are married to heads of government, so perhaps a better answer was Denis Thatcher, but he probably would not have relished the title."

==== Concepts ====
Concepts unknown or less known to a culture are difficult to translate because there are no corresponding lexemes. When translating US-specific concepts such as mobile home and foster children, translators cannot simply calque but find ways to adapt the translation such as using a descriptive phrase.

=== Poetry, puns and wordplay ===
The two areas which most nearly approach total untranslatability are poetry and puns; poetry is difficult to translate because of its reliance on the sounds (for example, rhymes) and rhythms of the source language; puns, and other similar semantic wordplay, because of how tightly they are tied to the original language. The oldest well-known examples are probably those appearing in Bible translations, for example, Genesis 2:7, which explains why God gave Adam this name: "God created Adam out of soil from the ground"; the original Hebrew text reveals the secret, since the word Adam connotes the word ground (being Adama in Hebrew), whereas translating the verse into other languages makes it lose the original pun.

Similarly, consider the Italian adage "traduttore, traditore": a literal translation is "translator, traitor". The pun is lost, though the meaning persists. A similar solution can be given, however, in Hungarian, by saying a fordítás: ferdítés, which roughly translates as "translation is distortion".

That being said, many of the translation procedures discussed here can be used in these cases. For example, the translator can compensate for an "untranslatable" pun in one part of a text by adding a new pun in another part of the translated text.

Oscar Wilde's play The Importance of Being Earnest incorporates in its title a pun (resonating in the last line of the play) that conflates the name Ernest with the adjective of quality earnest. The French title of the translated play is "L'importance d'être Constant", replicating and transposing the pun; however, the character Ernest had to be renamed, and the allusion to trickery was lost. (Other French translations include "De l'importance d'être Fidèle" (faithful) and "Il est important d'être Aimé" (loved), with the same idea of a pun on first name / quality adjective.) A Hungarian translation of the same play by Ádám Nádasdy applied a similar solution, giving the subtitle "Szilárdnak kell lenni" (lit. "One must be Szilárd") beside the traditional title "Bunbury", where "Szilárd" is a male name as well as an adjective meaning "solid", "firm", or "steady". Other languages, like Spanish, usually leave the pun untranslated, as in "La importancia de llamarse Ernesto", while one translation used the name Severo, which means "severe" or "serious", close to the original English meaning. Catalan translations always use "La importància de ser Frank". This example uses the homophones "Frank" (given name) and "franc" (honest, free-spoken). Although this same solution would work in Spanish also ("La importancia de ser Franco"), it carries heavy political connotations in Spain due to Francisco Franco's dictatorship (1939–1975), to a point that even this possible title can be taken directly as ironic/sarcastic: literally, "The importance of being Franco", so this alternative was never used. However, the German translation "Ernst sein ist alles" (literally "Being Ernst is everything") only changes the name very slightly: in fact (unlike the equivalents in English) the adjective ernst is even spelt exactly as the name Ernst and, given the position at the beginning of the title, both meanings would be capitalised.

The Asterix comic strip is renowned for its French puns; its translators have found many alternative English substitutes.

Other forms of wordplay, such as spoonerisms and palindromes are equally difficult, and often force hard choices on the translator. For example, take the classic palindrome: "A man, a plan, a canal: Panama". A translator might choose to translate it literally into, say, French – "Un homme, un projet, un canal: Panama", if it were used as a caption for a photo of Theodore Roosevelt (the chief instigator of the Canal), and sacrifice the palindrome. But if the text is meant to give an example of a palindrome, they might elect to sacrifice the literal sense and substitute a French palindrome, such as "Un roc lamina l'animal cornu" ('A boulder swept away the horned animal').

Douglas Hofstadter discusses the problem of translating a palindrome into Chinese, where such wordplay is theoretically impossible, in his book Le Ton beau de Marot – which is devoted to the issues and problems of translation, with particular emphasis on the translation of poetry. Another example given by Hofstadter is the translation of the poem Jabberwocky by Lewis Carroll, with its wealth of neologisms and portmanteau words, into a number of foreign tongues.

A notable Irish joke is that it is not possible to translate mañana into Irish as the Irish "don't have a word that conveys that degree of urgency".

=== Iconicity ===
According to Ghil'ad Zuckermann, "Iconicity might be the reason for refraining from translating Hallelujah and Amen in so many languages, as if the sounds of such basic religious notions have to do with their referents themselves – as if by losing the sound, one might lose the meaning. Compare this to the Kabbalistic power of letters, for example in the case of gematria, the method of interpreting the Hebrew Scriptures by interchanging words whose letters have the same numerical value when added. A simple example of gematric power might be the famous proverb נכנס יין יצא סוד (nikhnas yayin yåSå sōd), or lit. "entered wine went out secret", that is, "wine brings out the truth", in vino veritas. The gematric value of יין, or wine, is 70 (י=10; י=10; ן=50) and this is also the gematric value of סוד, or secret, (ס=60; ו=6; ד=4). Thus, this sentence, according to many Jews at the time, had to be true."

Barbarous names are magical formulas often taken from foreign languages, but corrupted or meaningless to the magician. Iamblichus discusses barbarous names, warning magicians not to translate them even if their original meaning is discovered, due to the belief that the power of the names resided in their sound, not their meaning. In the modern era, Aleister Crowley also argued that the supposed effectiveness of barbarous names rested in their utterance, not their meaning.

== See also ==
- Adam Jacot de Boinod
- Indeterminacy of translation
- Metaphor
- Terminology
- Terms with no direct English translation
- Texas sharpshooter fallacy
- Translation
