= Sentence word =

Single word that forms a full sentence

A sentence word (also called a one-word sentence) is a single word that forms a full sentence.

Henry Sweet described sentence words as 'an area under one's control' and gave words such as "Come!", "John!", "Alas!", "Yes." and "No." as examples of sentence words. The Dutch linguist J. M. Hoogvliet described sentence words as "volzinwoorden". They were also noted in 1891 by Georg von der Gabelentz, whose observations were extensively elaborated by Hoogvliet in 1903; he does not list "Yes." and "No." as sentence words. Wegener called sentence words "Wortsätze".

== Single-word utterances and child language acquisition ==
One of the predominant questions concerning children and language acquisition deals with the relation between the perception and the production of a child's word usage. It is difficult to understand what a child understands about the words that they are using and what the desired outcome or goal of the utterance should be.

Holophrases are defined as a "single-word utterance which is used by a child to express more than one meaning usually attributed to that single word by adults." The holophrastic hypothesis argues that children use single words to refer to different meanings in the same way an adult would represent those meanings by using an entire sentence or phrase. There are two opposing hypotheses as to whether holophrases are structural or functional in children. The two hypotheses are outlined below.

=== Structural holophrastic hypothesis ===
The structural version argues that children's “single word utterances are implicit expressions of syntactic and semantic structural relations.” There are three arguments used to account for the structural version of the holophrastic hypothesis: The comprehension argument, the temporal proximity argument, and the progressive acquisition argument.

- The comprehension argument is based on the idea that comprehension in children is more advanced than production throughout language acquisition. Structuralists believe that children have knowledge of sentence structure but they are unable to express it due to a limited lexicon. For example, saying “Ball!” could mean “Throw me the ball” which would have the structural relation of the subject of the verb. However, studies attempting to show the extent to which children understand syntactic structural relation, particularly during the one-word stage, end up showing that children “are capable of extracting the lexical information from a multi-word command,” and that they “can respond correctly to a multi-word command if that command is unambiguous at the lexical level.” This argument therefore does not provide evidence needed to prove the structural version of the holophrastic hypothesis because it fails to prove that children in the single-word stage understand structural relations such as the subject of a sentence and the object of a verb.
- The temporal proximity argument is based on the observation that children produce utterances referring to the same thing, close to each other. Even the utterances aren't connected, it is argued that children know about the linguistic relationships between the words, but cannot connect them yet. An example is laid out below:

→ Child: "Daddy" (holding pair of fathers pants)

1. → Child: "Bai" ('bai' is the term the child uses for any item of clothing)

The usage of 'Daddy' and 'Bai' used in close proximity are seen to represent a child's knowledge of linguistic relations; in this case the relation is the 'possessive'. This argument is seen as having insufficient evidence as it is possible that the child is only switching from one way to conceptualize pants to another. It is also pointed out that if the child had knowledge of linguistic relationships between words, then the child would combine the words together, instead of using them separately.

- Finally, the last argument in support of structuralism is the progressive acquisition argument. This argument states that children progressively gain new structural relations throughout the holophrastic stage. This is also unsupported by the research.

=== Functional holophrastic hypothesis ===
Functionalists doubt whether children really have structural knowledge, and argue that children rely on gestures to carry meaning (such as declarative, interrogative, exclamative or vocative). There are three arguments used to account for the functional version of the holophrastic hypothesis: The intonation argument, the gesture argument, and the predication argument.

- The intonation argument suggests that children use intonation in a contrastive way. Researchers have established through longitudinal studies that children have knowledge of intonation and can use it to communicate a specific function across utterances. Compare the two examples below:

→ Child: "Ball." (flat intonation) - Can mean "That is a ball."

1. → Child: "Ball?" (rising inflection) - Can mean "Where is the ball?"

However, it has been noted by Lois Bloom that there is no evidence that a child intends for intonation to be contrastive, it is only that adults are able to interpret it as such. Martyn Barrett contrasts this with a longitudinal study performed by him, where he illustrated the acquisition of a rising inflection by a girl who was a year and a half old. Although she started out using intonation randomly, upon acquisition of the term "What's that" she began to use rising intonation exclusively for questions, suggesting knowledge of its contrastive usage.

- The gesture argument establishes that some children use gesture instead of intonation contrastively. Compare the two examples laid out below:

→ Child: "Milk." (points at milk jug) - could mean “That is milk.”

1. → Child: "Milk." (open-handed gesture while reaching for a glass of milk) - could mean “I want milk.”

Each use of the word 'milk' in the examples above could have no use of intonation, or a random use of intonation, and so meaning is reliant on gesture. Anne Carter observed, however, that in the early stages of word acquisition children use gestures primarily to communicate, with words merely serving to intensify the message. As children move onto multi-word speech, content and context are also used alongside gesture.

- The predication argument suggests that there are three distinct functions of single word utterances, 'Conative', which is used to direct the behaviour of oneself or others; 'Expressive', which is used to express emotion; and referential, which is used to refer to things. The idea is that holophrases are predications, which is defined as the relationship between a subject and a predicate. Although McNeill originally intended this argument to support the structural hypothesis, Barrett believes that it more accurately supports the functional hypothesis, as McNeill fails to provide evidence that predication is expressed in holophrases.

== Single-word utterances and adult usage ==
While children use sentence words as a default strategy due to lack of syntax and lexicon, adults tend to use sentence words in a more specialized way, generally in a specific context or to convey a certain meaning. Because of this distinction, single word utterances in children are called 'holophrases', while in adults, they are called 'sentence words'. In both the child and adult use of sentence words, context is very important and relative to the word chosen, and the intended meaning.

=== Sentence word formation ===
Many sentence words have formed from the process of devaluation and semantic erosion. Various phrases in various languages have devolved into the words for "yes" and "no" (which can be found discussed in detail in yes and no), and these include expletive sentence words such as "Well!" and the French word "Ben!" (a parallel to "Bien!").

However, not all word sentences suffer from this loss of lexical meaning. A subset of sentence words, which Fonagy calls "nominal phrases", exist that retain their lexical meaning. These exist in Uralic languages, and are the remainders of an archaic syntax wherein there were no explicit markers for nouns and verbs. An example of this is the Hungarian language "Fecske!", which transliterates as "Swallow!", but which has to be idiomatically translated with multiple words "Look! A swallow!" for rendering the proper meaning of the original, which to a native Hungarian speaker is neither elliptical nor emphatic. Such nominal phrase word sentences occur in English as well, particularly in telegraphese or as the rote questions that are posed to fill in form data (e.g. "Name?", "Age?").

=== Sentence word syntax ===
A sentence word involves invisible covert syntax and visible overt syntax. The invisible section or "covert" is the syntax that is removed in order to form a one word sentence. The visible section or "overt" is the syntax that still remains in a sentence word. Within sentence word syntax there are 6 different clause-types: Declarative (making a declaration), exclamative (making an exclamation), vocative (relating to a noun), imperative (a command), locative (relating to a place), and interrogative (asking a question).

Sentence Word Syntax Examples
	Overt	Covert
Declarative	'**That is** excellent!'	'Excellent!'
Exclamative	'**That was** rude!'	'Rude!'
Vocative	'**There is** Mary!'	'Mary!'
Imperative	'**You should** leave!'	'Leave!'
Locative	'**The chair is** here.'	'Here.'
Interrogative	'Where **is it**?'	'Where?'

The words in bold above demonstrate that in the overt syntax structures, there are words that can be omitted in order to form a covert sentence word.

== Distribution cross-linguistically ==
Other languages use sentence words as well.

- In Japanese, a holophrastic or single-word sentence is meant to carry the least amount of information as syntactically possible, while intonation becomes the primary carrier of meaning. For example, a person saying the Japanese word e.g. "はい" (/haɪ/) = 'yes' on a high level pitch would command attention. Pronouncing the same word using a mid tone, could represent an answer to a roll-call. Finally, pronouncing this word with a low pitch could signify acquiescence: acceptance of something reluctantly.

Japanese Word "はい" (/haɪ/) 'Yes'
High tone pitch	Mid tone pitch	Low tone pitch
Command attention	Represent an answer to roll-call	Signify acquiescence acceptance of something reluctantly

- Modern Hebrew also exhibits examples of sentence words in its language, e.g. ".חַם" (/χam/) = "It is hot." or ".קַר" (/kar/) = "It is cold.".
