= Open-ended question =

Type of question

An open-ended question is a question that cannot be answered with a "yes" or "no" response, or with a static response. Open-ended questions are phrased as a statement which requires a longer answer. They can be compared to closed-ended questions which demand a “yes”/“no” or short answer.

== Examples ==
Examples of open-ended questions include:

- How do you envision your future?
- Can you tell me about the children in this photograph?
- What is the purpose of government?
- Why did you choose that answer?

== In education ==
The received wisdom in education is that open questions are broadly speaking 'good' questions. They invite students to give longer responses that demonstrate their understanding. They are preferable to closed questions (i.e. one that demands a yes/no answer) because they are better for discussions or enquiries, whereas closed questions are only good for testing.

Peter Worley argues that this is a false assumption. This is based on Worley's central arguments that there are two different kinds of open and closed questions: grammatical and conceptual. He argues that educational practitioners should be aiming for questions that are "grammatically closed, but conceptually open". For example, in standard parlance, 'is it ever right to lie?' would be regarded as a closed question: it elicits a yes/no response. Significantly, however, it is conceptually open. Any initial yes/no answer to it can be 'opened up' by the questioner ('why do you think that?,' 'Could there be an instance where that's not the case?), inviting elaboration and enquiry.

This grammatically closed but cognitively open style of questioning, Worley argues, "gives [educators] the best of both worlds: the focus and specificity of a closed question (this, after all, is why teachers use them) and the inviting, elaborating character of an open question". Closed questions simply require 'opening up' strategies to ensure that conceptually open questions can fulfil their educational potential.

Worley's structural and semantic distinction between open and closed questions is integral to his pedagogical invention 'Open Questioning Mindset', or OQM. OQM refers to the development, in educators, of an open attitude towards the process of learning and the questioning at the heart of that process. It is a mind-set that is applicable to all subject areas and all pedagogical environments. Teachers who develop an Open Questioning Mindset listen openly for the cognitive content of student's contributions and look for ways to use what is given for learning opportunities, whether right, wrong, relevant or apparently irrelevant. OQM encourages a style of pedagogy that values genuine enquiry in the classroom. It provides teachers with the tools to move beyond what Worley calls 'guess what's in my head' teaching, that relies on closed and leading questions.

== See also ==
- Clean language
