= Grammatical particle =

Concept in grammar

In grammar, the term particle (abbreviated ptcl) has a traditional meaning, as a part of speech that cannot be inflected, and a modern meaning, as a function word (functor) associated with another word or phrase in order to impart meaning. Although a particle may have an intrinsic meaning and may fit into other grammatical categories, the fundamental idea of the particle is to add context to the sentence, expressing a mood or indicating a specific action.

In English, for example, the phrase "oh well" has no purpose in speech other than to convey a mood. The word "up" is a particle in the phrase "look up" (as in "look up this topic"), implying that one researches something rather than that one literally gazes skywards.

Many languages use particles in varying amounts and for varying reasons. In Hindi, they may be used as honorifics, or to indicate emphasis or negation.

In some languages, they are clearly defined; for example, in Chinese, there are three types of zhùcí (助詞; 'particles'): structural, aspectual, and modal. Structural particles are used for grammatical relations. Aspectual particles signal grammatical aspects. Modal particles express linguistic modality.

However, Polynesian languages, which are almost devoid of inflection, use particles extensively to indicate mood, tense, and case.

== Modern meaning ==
In modern grammar, a particle is a function word that must be associated with another word or phrase to impart meaning, i.e., it does not have its own lexical definition. According to this definition, particles are a separate part of speech and are distinct from other classes of function words, such as articles, prepositions, conjunctions and adverbs. Languages vary widely in how much they use particles, some using them extensively and others more commonly using alternative devices such as prefixes/suffixes, inflection, auxiliary verbs and word order. Particles are typically words that encode grammatical categories (such as negation, mood, tense, or case), clitics, fillers or (oral) discourse markers such as well, um, etc. Particles are never inflected.

== Afrikaans ==
Some commonly used particles in Afrikaans include:

- nie_{2}: Afrikaans has a double negation system, as in:

Sy is nie_{1} moeg nie_{2}
She is not tired PTCL.NEG
'She is not tired'

The first nie_{1} is analysed as an adverb, while the second nie_{2} as a negation particle.

- te: Infinitive verbs are preceded by the complementiser om and the infinitival particle te, e.g.

Jy moet onthou om te eet
You must remember COMP PTCL.INF eat
'You must remember to eat'

- se or van: Both se and van are genitive particles, e.g.

Peter se boek
Peter PTCL.GEN book
'Peter's book'

die boek van Peter
the book PTCL.GEN Peter
'Peter's book'

- so and soos: These two particles are found in constructions like

so groot soos 'n huis
PTCL.CMPR big PTCL.CMPR a house
'as big as a house'

== Arabic ==
Particles in Arabic can take the form of a single root letter before a given word, like "-و" ('and'), "-ف" ('so') and "-ل" ('to'). However, other particles like "هل" (which marks a question) can be complete words as well.

== Chinese ==
There are three types of zhùcí (助詞; particles) in Chinese: Structural, Aspectual, and Modal. Structural particles are used for grammatical relations. Aspectual particles signal grammatical aspects. Modal particles express linguistic modality. Note that particles are different from zhùdòngcí (助動詞; modal verbs) in Chinese.

== English ==
Particle is a somewhat nebulous term for a variety of small words that do not conveniently fit into other classes of words. The Concise Oxford Companion to the English Language defines a particle as a "word that does not change its form through inflection and does not fit easily into the established system of parts of speech". The term includes the "adverbial particles" like up or out in verbal idioms (phrasal verbs) such as "look up" or "knock out"; it also includes the "infinitival particle" to, the "negative particle" not, the "imperative particles" do and let, and sometimes "pragmatic particles" (also called "fillers" or "discourse markers") like oh and well.

== German ==
A German modal particle serves no necessary syntactical function, but expresses the speaker's attitude towards the utterance. Modal particles include ja, halt, doch, aber, denn, schon and others. Some of these also appear in non-particle forms. Aber, for example, is also the conjunction but. In Er ist Amerikaner, aber er spricht gut Deutsch, "He is American, but he speaks German well," aber is a conjunction connecting two sentences. But in Er spricht aber gut Deutsch!, the aber is a particle, with the sentence perhaps best translated as "What good German he speaks!" These particles are common in speech but rarely found in written language, except that which has a spoken quality (such as online messaging).

== Hindi ==
There are different types of particles present in Hindi: emphatic particles, limiter particles, negation particles, affirmative particles, honorific particles, topic-marker particle and case-marking particles. Some common particles of Hindi are mentioned in the table below:

Hindi particles
Type	Particles	Notes	Sentences
Emphatic Particles	ही (hī) — Exclusive Emphatic Particle; भी (bhī) — Inclusive Emphatic Particle; यूँ (yū̃) — Manner Emphatic Particle	ही (hī) can roughly be translated as "only", "just", "alone" etc भी (bhī) can roughly be translated as "also", "too", "can't even" etc	1. बस कॉफ़ी ही लेके आये? (bas kôfī hī leke āye?); You brought just coffee?; 2. लिख भी नहीं सकते? (likh bhī nahī̃ sakte?); You can't even write?; 3. मैं यूँ जाऊँगा और यूँ आऊँगा। (ma͠i yū̃ jāū̃gā aur yū̃ āū̃gā.); I'll (instantly) go and (instantly) come back.
Limiter Particles	मात्र (mātr) — mere; बस (bas) — mere, only	मात्र (mātr) comes before a noun it modifies, and comes after a noun or verb or adverb when the meaning of "just/mere" is conveyed.	1. नारंगी मात्र दो हैं अपने पास। (nārangī mātr do hè̃ apne pās.); We have merely two oranges.
Negation Particles	नहीं (nahī̃) — Indicative Negation; न / ना (na / nā) — Subjunctive Negation; मत (mat) — Imperative Negation	नहीं (nahī̃) can have multiple positions in the same sentence while still conveying the same meaning. By default, it comes before the main verb of the sentence (or after the verb to emphasise). Usually, it doesn't appear at the end of a sentence and also at the beginning if the sentence starts with a noun. न (na) and मत (mat) have rather restricted positions in a sentence and can usually only appear around the verb in subjunctive mood or imperative form, respectively.	1. नहीं करना चाहिए ऐसा। (nahī̃ karnā čāhiye aisā.); One shouldn't do [like] that.; 2. ना हो ऐसा तो अच्छा हो। (nā ho aisā to acchā ho.); It'll be good if it doesn't happen [like that].; 3. मत कर यार ! (mat kar yār!); Don't do it, man!
Affirmative Particles	हाँ (hā̃) — "yes"; जी (jī) — "honorific yes"; जी हाँ (jī-hā̃) — "emphatic yes"; हाँ तो (hā̃-to) — "emphatic yes"		1. हाँ करता हूँ। (hā̃ kartā hū̃.); Yes, I (will) do it.; 2. जी और आप? (jī aur āp.); Yes, and you (formal)?; 3. जी हाँ करूँगा। (jī hā̃ karū̃gā.); Yes sure, I will do it.; 4. अरे हाँ तो ! किया है मैंने। (are hā̃ to! kiyā hai ma͠ine.); (I already said) yes! I have done it.
Honorific Particles	जी (jī) — "honour giving particle"	It comes after a noun and gives the noun an honorific value. Compare with the honorific particles in Japanese, e.g. さま (sama) and さん (san).	1. राहुल जी कैसे है? (rāhul jī kaise ha͠i?); How is Mr. Rahul?
Topic Marker Particles	तो (to) — "topic marker"	तो is used to mark the topic in the sentence which is often not the same the subject of a sentence. It indicates either presuppositionally shared information or shift in thematic orientation. It has a rather flexible position in a sentence; it always goes after the topic of the sentence, even if that topic contains other particles.	1. नेहा तो अच्छी है। (nehā to acchī hai.); [Speaking of] Neha [she] is good.; 2. तुम अच्छी तो हो पर उतनी नहीं। (tum acchī to ho par utnī nahī̃.); You "sure are" good but not that much.
Question Marker Particles	क्या (kyā) — "question marker"; ना (nā) — "doubt / confirmatory marker"	The question-marker क्या can come at the beginning or the end of a sentence as its default position but can also appear in between the sentence if it cannot also be interpreted as its non-particle meaning of "what" at a mid position in the sentence. ना can only come at the end of a sentence and nowhere else. It conveys that the asker is in doubt or is seeking for a confirmation.	1. वो गाता है क्या? (vo gātā hai kyā?); Does he sing?; 2. ऐसा करना होता है ना? (aisā karnā hota hai nā?); It should be done like this, no?; 3. ऐसा करें ना? (aisā karē̃ nā?); [Are you sure that] we do this? / we are doing this?
Case Marker Particles	को (ko) — "dative marker" & "accusative marker"; से (se) — "ablative marker" & "instrumental marker"; ने (ne) — "ergative marker"; का (kā) — "genitive marker"; में (mē̃) — "locative marker" "in / inside"; पे / पर (pe / par) — "locative marker" "on / at"; तक (tak) — "locative marker" "up to, until, as far as"; सा (sā) — "semblative marker" "like, -ish, -esque"	The case marking particles require the noun to be declined to be in their oblique case forms. However, these markers themselves (except for one) can inflect and change forms depending on the gender of the noun they modify.: Case / Hindi; ergative / ने (ne); accusative / को (ko); dative / को (ko); instrumental / से (se); ablative / से (se); genitive / का (kā); inessive / में (mē̃); adessive / पे (pe); terminative / तक (tak); semblative / सा (sā)	1. उसने उसको उससे मारा। (usne usko usse mārā.); He/she hit him/her with it.; 2. उसका है? (uskā hai?); Is it his?; 3. उससे निकालो और इसपे रखो। (usmē̃ se nikālo aur ispe rakho.); Take it out from that a keep it on this.; 4. उसमें होगा। (usmē̃ hogā.); It must be inside it.; 5. उसपे ढालना। (uspe ḍhālnā.); Pour it on that.; 6. कोई मुझसा नहीं। (koi mujhsā nahī̃.); No one's like me.; 7. चार बजे तक करना। (cār baje tak karnā.); Do it until four o'clock.

== Japanese and Korean ==
The term particle is often used in descriptions of Japanese and Korean, where they are used to mark nouns according to their grammatical case or thematic relation in a sentence or clause. Linguistic analyses describe them as suffixes, clitics, or postpositions. There are sentence-tagging particles such as Japanese question markers.

== Polynesian languages ==
Polynesian languages are almost devoid of inflection, and use particles extensively to indicate mood, tense, and case. Suggs, discussing the deciphering of the rongorongo script of Rapa Nui, describes them as all-important. In Māori for example, the versatile particle e can signal the imperative mood, the vocative case, the future tense, or the subject of a sentence formed with most passive verbs. The particle i signals the past imperfect tense, the object of a transitive verb or the subject of a sentence formed with "neuter verbs" (a form of passive verb), as well as the prepositions in, at and from.

=== Tokelauan ===
In Tokelauan, ia is used when describing personal names, month names, and nouns used to describe a collaborative group of people participating in something together. It also can be used when a verb does not directly precede a pronoun to describe said pronouns. Its use for pronouns is optional but mostly in this way. Ia cannot be used if the noun it is describing follows any of the prepositions e, o, a, or ko. A couple of the other ways unrelated to what is listed above that ia is used is when preceding a locative or place name. However, if ia is being used in this fashion, the locative or place name must be the subject of the sentence. Another particle in Tokelauan is a, or sometimes ā. This article is used before a person's name as well as the names of months and the particle a te is used before pronouns when these instances are following the prepositions i or ki. Ia te is a particle used if following the preposition mai.

== Russian ==
In Russian, particles sometimes play an important role making an additional nuance for a meaning of a phrase or of a whole sentence. One example is the particle бы, which imparts conditional mood (subjunctive) to a verb it is applied to or to a whole sentence. Other examples are -то and же which are usually used to emphasise or accent other words. Generally there are lots of different particles in Russian of many kinds. Some of them are complex, consisting of other particles, others are as simple as one letter (б, -с).

== Turkish ==
In some sources, exclamations and conjunctions are also considered Turkish particles. In this article, exclamations and conjunctions will not be dealt with, but only Turkish particles. The main particles used in Turkish are:

- ancak (Note: used with ama, fakat, lakin ('but').)
- başka, another
- beri, since
- bir, one
- bir tek, only
- dair, regarding
- doğru, right
- değil, not
- değin, mention
- denli, as much
- dek, until
- dolayı, due
- diye, so
- evvel, before
- gayri, informal
- gibi, like
- göre, by
- için, for
- ile, with (Note: used with ve ('and'))
- kadar, until
- karşı, against
- karşın, although or despite
- mukabil, corresponding
- önce, prior to
- ötürü, due to
- öte, beyond
- rağmen, despite
- sadece, only
- sanki, as if
- sonra, then
- sıra, row
- üzere, to
- yalnız, alone

Particles can be used with the simple form of the names to which they are attached or in other cases. Some of particles uses with attached form, and some particles are always used after the relevant form. For examples, -den ötürü, -e dek, -den öte, -e doğru:

- Bu çiçekleri annem için alıyorum. (anne is nominative)
- Yarına kadar bu ödevi bitirmem lazım. (dative)
- Düşük notlarından ötürü çok çalışman gerekiyor. (ablative)

Turkish particles according to their functions. Başka, gayrı, özge used for 'other, another, otherwise, new, diverse, either'.

- Senden gayrı kimsem yok. No one other than you.
- Yardım istemekten başka çaremiz kalmadı. We have no choice but to ask for help.

Göre, nazaran, dâir, rağmen used for 'by, in comparison, about, despite'.

- Çok çalışmama rağmen sınavda hedeflediğim başarıyı yakalayamadım.
- Duyduğuma göre bitirme sınavları bir hafta erken gerçekleşecekmiş.
- Şirketteki son değişikliklere dâir bilgi almak istiyorum.

İçin, üzere, dolayı, ötürü, nâşi, diye used for 'for, with, because, because of, how'.

- Açılış konuşmasını yapmak üzere kürsüye çıktı.
- Bu raporu bitirebilmek için zamana ihtiyacım var.
- Kardeşim hastalığından nâşi gelemedi.

== See also ==
- Ilocano particles
- Nobiliary particle
- Okinawan particles
- Proto-Indo-European particles
- Sentence-final particle
- Uninflected word
