= German modal particles =

Uninflected words used in colloquial spoken German

German modal particles (German: Modalpartikel or Abtönungspartikel) are uninflected words that are used mainly in the spontaneous spoken language in colloquial registers in German. Their dual function is to reflect the mood or the attitude of the speaker or the narrator and to highlight the sentence's focus.

Often, a modal particle has an effect that is vague and depends on the overall context. Speakers sometimes combine several particles, as in doch mal, ja nun or ja doch nun mal. It is a feature typical of the spoken language.

Most German words can be translated into English without any problems but modal particles are a challenge to translate because English has no real equivalent to them.

== List of modal particles ==
Halt, eben and einmal (in this context always in full) and nun einmal (shortened: nun mal) imply that the often-unpleasant fact expressed in a sentence cannot be changed and must be accepted. Halt and nun mal are more colloquial than eben. In English, they could be rendered by "as a matter of fact" or "happen to":

Gute Kleider sind eben teuer. ("Good clothes are expensive, and it can't be helped." / "Good clothes happen to be expensive.")
Er hat mich provoziert, da habe ich ihn halt geschlagen. ("He provoked me so I hit him – what did you expect?")
Es ist nun einmal so. ("That's just how it is.")

Einmal, shortened to mal (literally "once", roughly "for once") (Note: The colloquial shortening of einmal to mal is not considered standard, unlike for modal particles.) primarily indicates that the speaker dispenses with temporal precision, it can indicate a certain immediacy to the action or even imply a command. On the other hand, it can give a kind of casualness to a sentence and so makes it sound less blunt:

Hör mal zu! (Listen!" or "Listen to me"!)
Beeile dich mal! ("Do hurry up!")
Sing mal etwas Schönes! ("Why don't you sing something pretty?")
Schauen wir mal. (lit.: "Let's take one look." meaning: "Let's just relax and then we'll see what we'll be doing.")

Ja ("you know"/"everyone knows"/"I already told you") indicates that the speaker thinks that the fact should already be known to the listener and intends the statement to be more of a reminder or conclusion:

Ich habe ihm ein Buch geschenkt, er liest ja sehr gerne. ("I gave him a book as, you know, he likes to read.")
Heidi ist ja ein Kind. ("Heidi is a child as you can see.")

Doch can have several meanings. (See also Yes and no § Three-form systems.) It can be used affirmatively or to convey emphasis, urgency or impatience. It can also be a reply to a real, imagined, or pre-emptively-answered disagreement, hesitation, or wrong assumption on the part of the listener or other people. In other situations, it can have different effects.

Conversely, doch can also express doubt and in writing, the affirmative and the doubtful meanings may be ambiguous and depend on context. In speech, the different meanings of doch can be told apart by different types of emphasis:

Gehst Du nicht nach Hause? Doch, ich gehe gleich. ("Are you not going home?" "Oh, yes, I am going in a moment".) (Affirmation of a negative question; obligatory.)
Komm doch her! ("Do come here!") (Emphatically)
Komm doch endlich her! ("Do come on! Get a move on!") (More emphatically and impatiently)
Ich habe dir doch gesagt, dass es nicht so ist. ("I did tell you that it isn't like that." or "I told you it isn't like that, didn't I?")
Ich kenne mich in Berlin aus. Ich war doch letztes Jahr dort. ("I know my way around Berlin. I was there last year, after all/as a matter of fact.")

In that way, doch can be similar to stressed schon ("indeed"), but stressed schon implies an actual qualification of the statement, which is often made explicit by a phrase with aber ("but"):

Ich war schon auf der Party, aber Spaß hatte ich nicht. ("I was indeed at the party, but I did not enjoy myself.")

That should not be confused with the adverbial meaning of the unstressed schon, "already". However, at least in writing, schon "already" must be either made unmistakable by the context, such as by additional adverbs, or replaced by its equivalent, bereits:

Ich war schon (/bereits) auf der Party, aber Spaß hatte ich (noch) nicht. ("I was already at the party, but I hadn't had any fun (yet).")

In other contexts, doch indicates that the action described in the sentence is unlikely to occur:

Du bist also doch gekommen! ("You came after all.")
Ich sehe nicht viel fern, aber wenn etwas Gutes kommt, schalte ich doch ein. ("I don't watch much TV, but I do tune in if something good comes on.")

Gar is used to intensify a statement, the completeness or a total lack of something:

Ich besitze gar kein Auto. ("I'm afraid I have no car [at all].")

At the beginning of a sentence, especially in literary contexts, gar sometimes has a different meaning and is often interchangeable with sogar or ganz:

Gar die Lehrerin hat über dich gelacht! = Sogar die Lehrerin hat über dich gelacht! ("Even the teacher laughed at you!") Here, gar does not act as a modal particle.
Gar 20 Jahre lebe ich jetzt schon hier. = Ganze 20 Jahre lebe ich jetzt schon hier. ("I have already been living here for two entire decades.")

Rein often precedes gar to point out the total lack of something:

Ich habe rein gar nichts gemacht! ("I did absolutely nothing!")

Total, besides its use as an adjective and adverb, can also act as a modal particle indicating irony. It is best translated as "well", "really" or "let me think...":

A: Hast du Lust meinen Geschirrspüler auszuräumen? B: Total... ("A: Do you want to empty my dishwasher? B: Let me think... no!")
Ich musste heute drei Stunden beim Arzt warten... hat total Spaß gemacht... ("Today I had to wait for three hours at the doctor's office... it really was a lot of fun!")

Aber, when not as a conjunction, is very similar to doch and conveys a meaning of disagreement to a previously stated or implied assertion. Alternatively aber can be used to show surprise:

Du sprichst aber schon gut Deutsch! ("But you do already speak good German!")
Du sprichst aber gut Deutsch! ("Wow, do you speak good German!")

Sowieso, ohnehin or eh, meaning "anyway(s)", implies an emphasized assertion. Especially in Southern German, eh is colloquially most common. All these can be enforced by a preceding doch:

Ich hab ihm eh gesagt, dass er sich wärmer anziehen soll. ("I told him to put on warmer clothes in the first place.")
Das ist eh nicht wahr. ("That's not true anyway.")

Vielleicht, as a modal particle, is used for emphasis and should not be confused with the adverb vielleicht, meaning "perhaps":

Das ist vielleicht ein großer Hund! (with an emphasis on "Das", "That's quite a large dog!")

But:

Vielleicht ist das ein großer Hund. Es ist schwer zu erkennen. ("Maybe that's a large dog. It's difficult to tell.")

Fei, which is no longer recognised as the adverb fein "finely", is a particle peculiar to Upper German dialects. It denotes that the speaker states that something important might be a surprise for the listener. Giving an adequate translation even into Standard German is difficult, and the best substitute would probably be to use an understatement with strong affirmative meaning. In English, translations to "I should think" or "just to mention" seem possible depending on context:

Des kôsch fei net macha! (Swabian) = Das kannst du (eigentlich wirklich) nicht machen. (You can't do that! / If you do look at it, you really can't do that. / You can't, I should think, do that.)
I bin fei ned aus Preissen! (Bavarian) = Ich bin, das wollte ich nur einmal anmerken, nicht aus Preußen. / Ich bin wohlgemerkt (gar) nicht aus Preußen. (Just to mention, I'm not from Prussia.)

Wohl is often used instead of epistemic adverbs, such as vermutlich or wahrscheinlich or to emphasise a strong disagreement. A literal translation with "probably" or at least with "seemingly" is possible:

Es wird wohl Regen geben. ("It looks like rain. / It's probably going to rain.")
Du bist wohl verrückt! ("You must be out of your mind!")
