= OK =

English word

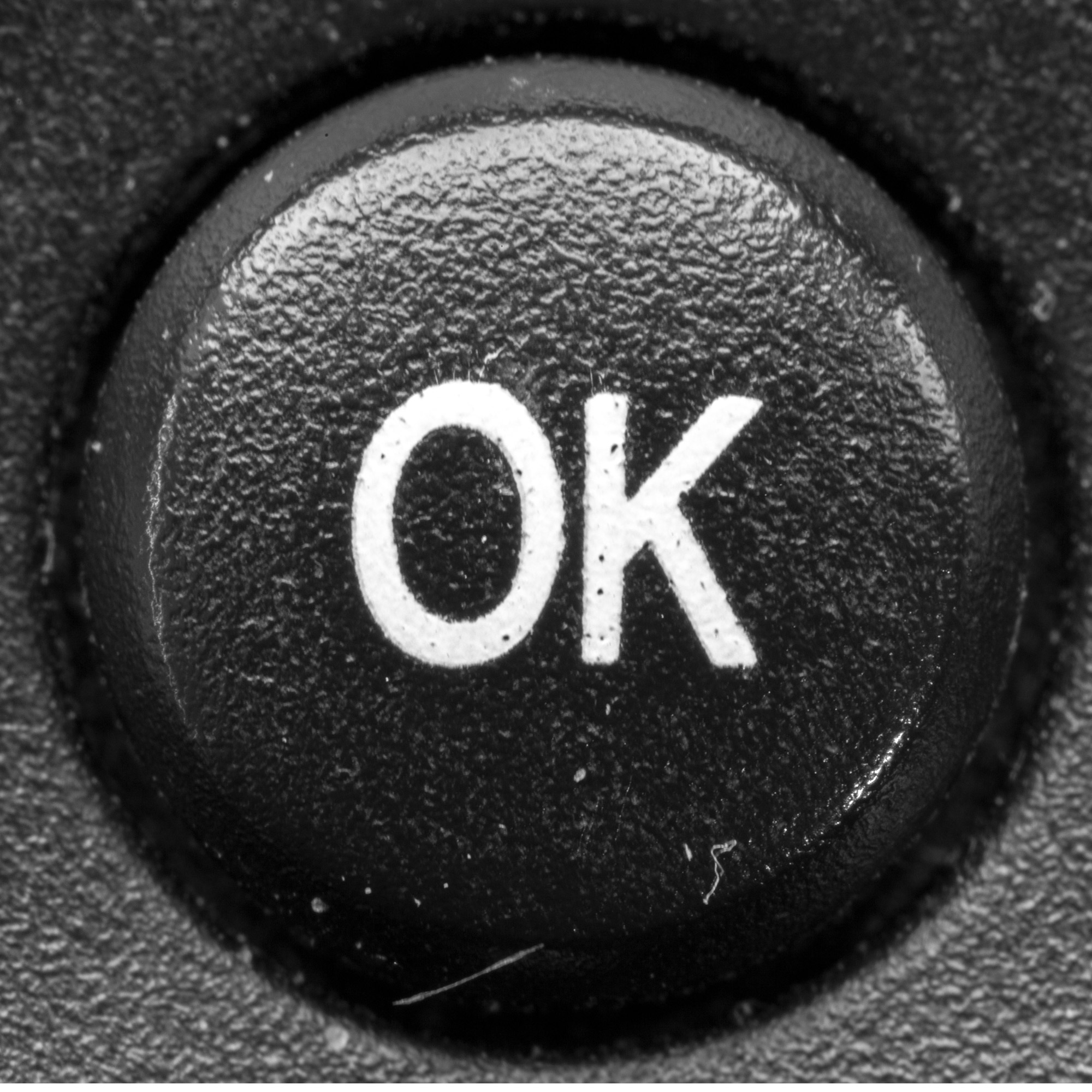
An OK button on a remote control

OK (/ˌoʊˈkeɪ/), with spelling variations including okay, O.K. and many others, is an English word (originating in American English) denoting approval, acceptance, agreement, assent, acknowledgment, or a sign of indifference. OK is frequently used as a loanword in other languages. It has been described as the most frequently spoken or written word on the planet.

The origin of OK is disputed; however, most modern reference works hold that it originated around Boston as part of a fad in the late 1830s of abbreviating misspellings – that it is an initialism of "oll korrect" as a misspelling of "all correct". This origin was first described by linguist Allen Walker Read in the 1960s.

As an adjective, OK principally means "adequate" or "acceptable" as a contrast to "bad" ("The boss approved this, so it is OK to send out"); it can also mean "mediocre" when used in contrast with "good" ("The french fries were great, but the burger was just OK"). It fulfills a similar role as an adverb ("Wow, you did OK for your first time skiing!"). As an interjection, it can denote compliance ("OK, I will do that"), or agreement ("OK, that is fine"). It can mean "assent" when it is used as a noun ("the boss gave her the OK to the purchase") or, more colloquially, as a verb ("the boss OKed the purchase"). OK, as an adjective, can express acknowledgement without approval. As a versatile discourse marker or continuer, it can also be used with appropriate intonation to show doubt or to seek confirmation ("OK?", "Is that OK?"). Some of this variation in use and shape of the word is also found in other languages.

== Etymologies ==
Many explanations for the origin of the expression have been suggested, but few have been discussed seriously by linguists. The following proposals have found mainstream recognition.

=== Boston abbreviation fad ===
The etymology that most reference works provide today is based on a survey of the word's early history in print: a series of six articles by Allen Walker Read in the journal American Speech in 1963 and 1964. He tracked the spread and evolution of the word in American newspapers and other written documents, and later throughout the rest of the world. He also documented controversy surrounding OK and the history of its folk etymologies, both of which are intertwined with the history of the word itself. Read argues that, at the time of the expression's first appearance in print, a broader fad existed in the United States of "comical misspellings" and of forming and employing acronyms, themselves based on colloquial speech patterns:

The abbreviation fad began in Boston in the summer of 1838 ... and used expressions like OFM, "our first men," NG, "no go," GT, "gone to Texas," and SP, "small potatoes." Many of the abbreviated expressions were exaggerated misspellings, a stock in trade of the humorists of the day. One predecessor of OK was OW, "oll wright."

The general fad is speculated to have existed in spoken or informal written U.S. English for a decade or more before its appearance in newspapers. OK's original presentation as "all correct" was later varied with spellings such as "Oll Korrect" or even "Ole Kurreck".

The term appears to have achieved national prominence in 1840, when supporters of the Democratic Party claimed during the 1840 United States presidential election that it stood for "Old Kinderhook", a nickname for the Democratic president and candidate for reelection, Martin Van Buren, a native of Kinderhook, New York. "Vote for OK" was snappier than using his Dutch name. In response, Whig opponents attributed OK, in the sense of "Oll Korrect", to the bad spelling of Andrew Jackson, Van Buren's predecessor. The country-wide publicity surrounding the election appears to have been a critical event in OK's history, widely and suddenly popularizing it across the United States.

Allen Walker Read proposed an etymology of OK in "Old Kinderhook" in 1941. The evidence presented in that article was somewhat sparse, and the connection to "Oll Korrect" not fully elucidated. Various challenges to the etymology were presented; e.g., Heflin's 1962 article. However, Read's landmark 1963–1964 papers silenced most of the skepticism. Read's etymology gained immediate acceptance, and is now offered without reservation in most dictionaries. Read himself was nevertheless open to evaluating alternative explanations:

Some believe that the Boston newspaper's reference to OK may not be the earliest. Some are attracted to the claim that it is of American-Indian origin. There is an Indian word, okeh, used as an affirmative reply to a question. Mr Read treated such doubting calmly. "Nothing is absolute," he once wrote, "nothing is forever."

=== Choctaw ===
In "All Mixed Up", first released in 1965, the folk singer Pete Seeger sang that OK was of Choctaw origin, as the dictionaries of the time tended to agree. Three major American reference works (Webster's, New Century, Funk & Wagnalls) cited this etymology as the probable origin until as late as 1961.

The earliest written evidence for the Choctaw origin is provided in work by the Christian missionaries Cyrus Byington and Alfred Wright in 1825. These missionaries ended many sentences in their translation of the Bible with the particle "okeh", meaning "it is so", which was listed as an alternative spelling in the 1913 Webster's.

Byington's Dictionary of the Choctaw Language confirms the ubiquity of the "okeh" particle, and his Grammar of the Choctaw Language calls the particle -keh an "affirmative contradistinctive", with the "distinctive" o- prefix.

Subsequent Choctaw spelling books de-emphasized the spellings lists in favor of straight prose, and they made use of the particle[,] but they too never included it in the word lists or discussed it directly. The presumption was that the use of particle "oke" or "hoke" was so common and self-evident as to preclude any need for explanation or discussion for either its Choctaw or non-Choctaw readership.

The Choctaw language was one of the languages spoken at this time in the Southeastern United States by a tribe with significant contact with African slaves. The major language of trade in this area, Mobilian Jargon, was based on Choctaw-Chickasaw, two Muskogean-family languages. This language was used, in particular, for communication with the slave-owning Cherokee (an Iroquoian-family language). For the three decades prior to the Boston abbreviation fad, the Choctaw had been in extensive negotiation with the U.S. government, after having fought alongside them at the Battle of New Orleans.

Arguments for a more Southern origin for the word note the tendency of English to adopt loan words in language contact situations, as well as the ubiquity of the OK particle. Similar particles exist in native language groups distinct from Iroquoian (Algonquian, Cree cf. "ekosi").

=== West African origin ===
An early attestation of the particle 'kay' is found in a 1784 transcription of a North Carolina slave, who, seeking to avoid being flogged, explained being found asleep in the canoe he had been ordered to bring to a certain place to pick up a European exploring near his newly-purchased property:

Kay, massa, you just leave me, me sit here, great fish jump up into da canoe, here he be, massa, fine fish, massa; me den very grad; den me sit very still, until another great fish jump into de canoe; but me fall asleep...

A West African (Mande and/or Bantu) etymology has been argued in scholarly sources, tracing the word back to the Wolof and Bantu word waw-kay or the Mande (aka "Mandinke" or "Mandingo") phrase o ke.

David Dalby first made the claim that the particle OK could have African origins in the 1969 Hans Wolff Memorial Lecture. His argument was reprinted in various newspaper articles between 1969 and 1971. This suggestion has also been mentioned by Joseph Holloway, who argued in the 1993 book The African Heritage of American English (co-written with a retired missionary) that various West African languages have near-homophone discourse markers with meanings such as "yes indeed" or which serve as part of the back-channeling repertoire. Frederic Cassidy challenged Dalby's claims, asserting that there is no documentary evidence that any of these African-language words had any causal link with its use in the American press.

The West African hypothesis had not been accepted by 1981 by any etymologists, yet has since appeared in scholarly sources published by linguists and non-linguists alike.

=== Alternative etymologies ===
A large number of origins have been proposed. Some of them are thought to fall into the category of folk etymology and are proposed based merely on apparent similarity between OK and one or another phrase in a foreign language with a similar meaning and sound. Some examples are:

- A corruption from the speech of the large number of descendants of Scottish and Ulster Scots (Scots-Irish) immigrants to North America, of the common Scots phrase och aye ("oh yes").
- A borrowing of the Greek phrase όλα καλά (óla kalá), meaning "all good".

== Early history in print ==
Allen Walker Read identifies the earliest known use of O.K. in print as 1839, in the edition of 23 March of the Boston Morning Post. The announcement of a trip by the Anti-Bell-Ringing Society (a "frolicsome group" according to Read) received attention from the Boston papers. Charles Gordon Greene wrote about the event using the line that is widely regarded as the first instance of this strain of OK, complete with gloss:

The above is from the Providence Journal, the editor of which is a little too quick on the trigger, on this occasion. We said not a word about our deputation passing "through the city" of Providence.—We said our brethren were going to New York in the Richmond, and they did go, as per Post of Thursday. The "Chairman of the Committee on Charity Lecture Bells," is one of the deputation, and perhaps if he should return to Boston, via Providence, he of the Journal, and his train-band, would have his "contribution box," et ceteras, o.k.—all correct—and cause the corks to fly, like sparks, upward.

Read gives a number of subsequent appearances in print. Seven instances were accompanied with glosses that were variations on "all correct" such as "oll korrect" or "ole kurreck", but five appeared with no accompanying explanation, suggesting that the word was expected to be well known to readers and possibly in common colloquial use at the time.

Various claims of earlier usage have been made. For example, it was claimed that the phrase appeared in a 1790 court record from Sumner County, Tennessee, discovered in 1859 by a Tennessee historian named Albigence Waldo Putnam, in which Andrew Jackson apparently said "proved a bill of sale from Hugh McGary to Gasper Mansker, for a Negro man, which was O.K.". The lawyer who successfully argued many Indian rights claims, Felix S. Cohen, supported the Jacksonian popularization of the term based on its Choctaw origin:

When Andrew Jackson popularized a word that his Choctaw neighbors always used in their councils to signify agreement, the aristocrats he threw out of office, always grasping at a chance to ridicule backwoods illiteracy, accused him of abbreviating and misspelling "All Correct". But O.K. (or okeh, in Choctaw) does not mean "all correct"; it means that we have reached a point where practical agreement is possible, however far from perfection it may lie.

David Dalby brought up a 1941 reference dating the term to 1815. The apparent notation "we arrived ok" appears in the hand-written diary of William Richardson traveling from Boston to New Orleans about a month after the Battle of New Orleans. However, Frederic Cassidy asserts that he personally tracked down this diary, writing:

After many attempts to track down this diary, Read and I at last discovered that it is owned by the grandson of the original writer, Professor L. Richardson, Jr., of the Department of Classical Studies at Duke University. Through his courtesy we were able to examine this manuscript carefully, to make greatly enlarged photographs of it, and to become convinced (as is Richardson) that, whatever the marks in the manuscript are, they are not OK.

Similarly, H. L. Mencken, who originally considered it "very clear that 'o. k.' is actually in the manuscript", later recanted his endorsement of the expression, asserting that it was used no earlier than 1839. Mencken (following Read) described the diary entry as a misreading of the author's self-correction, and stated it was in reality the first two letters of the words a h[andsome] before noticing the phrase had been used in the previous line and changing his mind.

Another example given by Dalby is a Jamaican planter's diary of 1816, which records a black slave saying "Oh ki, massa, doctor no need be fright, we no want to hurt him". Cassidy asserts that this is a misreading of the source, which actually begins "Oh, ki, massa ...", where ki is a phrase by itself:

In all other examples of this interjection that I have found, it is simply ki (once spelled kie). As here, it expresses surprise, amusement, satisfaction, mild expostulation, and the like. It has nothing like the meaning of the adjective OK, which in the earliest recorded examples means 'all right, good,' though it later acquires other meanings, but even when used as an interjection does not express surprise, expostulation, or anything similar.

== Variations ==
Whether this word is printed as OK, Ok, ok, okay, or O.K. is a matter normally resolved in the style manual for the publication involved. Dictionaries and style guides such as The Chicago Manual of Style and The New York Times Manual of Style and Usage provide no consensus. Whilst most variants have descended from the root "OK", "okay" predominates in edited English as it permits easier modification (e.g. by pluralising).

The spelling okeh was popularized in 1918 by President Woodrow Wilson, who wrote "Okeh W. W." on informal memoranda to indicate his approval. When this spelling confused his secretaries, Wilson said that he had found it in the latest edition of the Century Dictionary, which described O.K. as "a humorous or ignorant spelling of what should be okeh", citing Byington's Dictionary of the Choctaw Language. David Lawrence wrote an article about Wilson's usage of okeh for the Saturday Evening Post, published in the magazine's edition of May 4, 1918. By the end of that month, the obscure spelling had caught on; columnist Francis De Sales Ryan wrote on May 31 that "the now famous 'okeh,' President Wilson's word of approval, [...] in good usage is certain to supersede the nonsensical form 'O. K.'", although he noted that the Century Dictionary was in error and that the Choctaw word should actually be spelled oke. Ryan returned to the subject in 1955, telling the United Press International that he had researched the origin of OK and felt confident that it had been created by Van Buren's supporters in 1839. The spelling okeh remained popular for much of the 20th century, helped along by the success of Columbia's Okeh Records label, but virtually disappeared after the 1960s as further research into the word's origin was published and American dictionaries ceased to recommend the spelling.

Variation	Description
hokay	Used as an alternative.
k or kk or oka	Commonly used in instant messaging, or in SMS messages. Before the days of SMS, "K" ▄▄▄ ▄ ▄▄▄ was used as a Morse code prosign for "Go Ahead".
Okie dokie	This slang term was popularized in the film "The Little Rascals" (Oki doki). Also with alternate spellings, including okeydoke. The phrase can be extended further, e.g. "Okie dokie (aka) pokie / smokie / artichokie / karaoke / lokie", etc.
A-OK	Variant attributed to Alan Shepard and the 1961 NASA launch of the Mercury mission.
M'kay	Slang term popularized by South Park TV show. Pronounced also as "Mmmm K". This variation has connotations of sarcasm, such as condescending disagreement.
Okily Dokily!	Catchphrase used by Ned Flanders in The Simpsons.
Oki or okii or okie	Humorous respellings of okay.

=== International usage ===
Language	Form	Usage/history
Afrikaans	oukei	Used in colloquial Afrikaans.
Arabic	اوكي or اوك	Arabic speakers also use the word widely, particularly in areas of former British presence like Egypt, Iraq, Israel, Jordan, and Palestine. The prevalence of the term in the Arab world can be attributed to the prevalence of American cinema and television. It is pronounced just as it is in English but is very rarely seen in Arabic newspapers and formal media.
Catalan	okey	
Chinese	OK	In Mainland China, the native term 好; hǎo (literally: "good") is more often used instead, saying "OK" is usually reserved for when communicating with foreigners. However, the term tends to be modified into "OK了" (OK le) to better fit Mandarin grammar. (The "了" indicates a change of state; in this case it indicates the achievement of consensus.) It is also somewhat humorously used in the "spelling" of the word for karaoke, "卡拉OK", pronounced "kah-lah-oh-kei" (Mandarin does not natively have a syllable with the pronunciation "kei"). On computers, OK is usually translated as 确定; quèdìng, which means "confirm" or "confirmed". In Taiwan, OK is frequently used in various sentences, popular among but not limited to younger generations. This includes the aforementioned "OK了" (Okay le), "OK嗎" (Okay ma), meaning "Is it okay?" or "OK啦" (Okay la), a strong, persuading affirmative (similar to English's "Alright, cool"), as well as the somewhat tongue-in-cheek yes/no construction "O不OK?" (O bù OK?), "Is it OK or not?", again adopting the term into Chinese grammar.
Czech	oukej	Pronounced as the English OK. When written OK, it is pronounced [o:ka:]. Neither version recognized as official. Registered since the 1940s.
Danish	okay, OK [ɔʊ̯kʰɛɪ̯] [oːˀ kʰɔːˀ] (Note: Based on the individual pronunciation of the letters o and k in the language rather than English.)	Appears from the 1930s. Pronunciation can be reduced and both vowels may become monophthongs. There is a difference in meaning between stress on first or last syllable.
Dutch	oké	oke, ok and okay are also used, but are less common in the formal written language.
Esperanto	o kej	The word is pronounced with stress on the second syllable.
Estonian	okei	Okei is the most common form, but others include okk, okoo, oki, okas, okeika and reduplicated versions.
Faroese	ókey [ɔuˈkɛɪ]	Possibly loaned in the 1940s as a result of the British occupation of the Faroe Islands or through Danish.
Filipino	okay	Especially in the phrase okay lang 'it's okay'.
Finnish	OK, okei [okeɪ], [oukeɪ], [ookoo]	Used since the 1930s. Used as part of conversational transition and closing, to signal acceptance of a directive, and to respond to sharing of information.
French	oké	
German	O.K., o.k., okay [owkeɪ] [ɔˈkeː], [oˈkeː]	Used to mark understanding, agreement, closing and transition.
Greek	OK, οκ [ocei] [ok] (Note: Reading of the spelling without treating it as an abbreviation.)	
Modern Hebrew	או קיי	Common as equivalent to the Hebrew word בסדר [b'seder] ('adequate', 'in order').
Hungarian	oké	
Icelandic	ókei	
Indonesia	ok, oke, or okey	Sometimes using with suffix "lah": oklah, okelah. in chatting on social media sometimes indonesians only type "oklh" to minimize time to type.
Japanese	オーケー (lit. 'ōkē'), オッケー (lit. 'okkē')	Early records include a song from 1930 and a novel in 1951. The word has a high-low tone. Also used in a reduplicated form.
Korean	오케이 /okʰei/	Occurs in newspapers, magazines and novels from the 1920s. The word is found in a 1937 loanword dictionary.
Latvian	okej	ok also used, but considered to be a part of more colloquial internet language.
Macedonian	okej	
Malay	OK	Frequently used with the emphatic suffix "lah": OK-lah.
Maldivian	Okay	Used in different ways, often used to agree with something, more often used while departing from a gathering "Okay Dahnee/Kendee."
Maltese	owkej	Pronounced as the English OK.
Norwegian	OK, ok [okeɪ] or [o ko]	Okei and oukei are also commonly used written or spoken.
Polish	okej	The most frequent form is okej, but others are oki, oka, okidok, okejka and okejos.
Portuguese	OK, oquei	
Russian	окей [ɐˈkʲeɪ̯], ок [ok]	There are many variations such as оке, оки and океюшки. Also used for conversation closure.
Serbo-Croatian	okej	
Singlish	OK	OK is often used with suffixes used such as OK lor, OK lah, OK meh, OK leh, which are used in different occasions.
Slovak	oukej, okej, OK [oʊkeɪ] [o:ka:]	
Slovene	okej, okay	
Spanish	okey	Used in Spain in the 1980s. Also part of the phrase okey, makey.
Swedish	okej	
Thai	โอเค	Pronounced "o khe".
Turkish	okey	Has a secondary meaning referring to the game Okey, from a company that used the word as its name in the 1960s.
Urdu	OK	
Vietnamese	ô-kê	Used in Vietnam; okey also used, but ok more commonly.

== Gesture ==
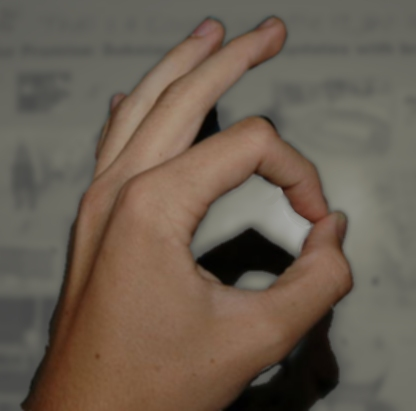
Okay sign

In the United States and much of Europe a related gesture is made by touching the index finger with the thumb (forming a rough circle) and raising of the remaining fingers. It is not known whether the gesture is derived from the expression, or if the gesture appeared first. The gesture was popularized in the United States in 1840 as a symbol to support then-presidential candidate and incumbent vice president Martin Van Buren. This was because Van Buren's nickname, Old Kinderhook, derived from his hometown of Kinderhook, New York, had the initials O.K. Similar gestures have different meanings in other cultures, some offensive, others devotional.

== Computers ==
Example of OK and Cancel buttons in Windows Notepad

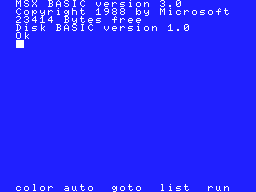
The command prompt for user input in MSX BASIC was Ok

OK is used to label buttons in modal dialog boxes such as error messages or print dialogs, indicating that the user can press the button to accept the contents of the dialog box and continue. When the dialog box contains only one button, it is almost always labeled OK. When there are two buttons, they are most commonly labeled OK and Cancel. OK is commonly rendered in upper case and without punctuation: OK, rather than O.K. or Okay. The OK button can probably be traced to user interface research done for the Apple Lisa.

The Forth programming language prints ok when ready to accept input from the keyboard. This prompt is used on Sun, Apple, and other computers with the Forth-based Open Firmware (OpenBoot). The appearance of ok in inappropriate contexts is the subject of some humor.

In the Hypertext Transfer Protocol (HTTP), upon which the World Wide Web is based, a successful response from the server is defined as OK (with the numerical code 200 as specified in RFC 2616). The Session Initiation Protocol also defines a response, 200 OK, which conveys success for most requests (RFC 3261).

Some Linux distributions, including those based on Red Hat Linux, display boot progress on successive lines on-screen, which include [ OK ].

=== In Unicode ===
Several Unicode characters are related to visual renderings of OK:

- U+1F197 🆗 SQUARED OK
- U+1F44C 👌 OK HAND SIGN
- U+1F44D 👍 THUMBS UP SIGN
- U+1F592 🖒 REVERSED THUMBS UP SIGN
- U+1F646 🙆 FACE WITH OK GESTURE
