= List of proposed etymologies of OK =

Several etymologies have been proposed for the word OK or okay. The majority can be easily classified as false etymologies, or possibly folk etymologies. H. L. Mencken, in The American Language, lists serious candidates and "a few of the more picturesque or preposterous". Allen Walker Read surveyed a variety of explanations in a 1964 article titled "The Folklore of 'O. K.'" Eric Partridge described O.K. as "an evergreen of the correspondence column."

Source language	Source	Context	Date first used	Proposer	Date proposed	Notes
English	Initials of "oll korrect", a misspelling of "all correct"	Coined during a fad for comical misspellings and abbreviations	by 1839		by 1839	Documented by Allen Walker Read in 1964, and subsequently widely accepted by dictionaries and etymologists.
English	Initials of "Old Kinderhook"	Nickname for Martin Van Buren, from his birthplace in Kinderhook, New York; used as a slogan in the 1840 presidential election	by 1840	editor of the New York New Era	27 May 1840	Reinterpreted by supporters of rival William Henry Harrison as "Out of Kash", "Orful Kalamity", etc. Allen Walker Read suggests this exploited and reinforced the pre-existing "oll korrect" sense.
Choctaw	oke, okeh ("it is")	Frontiersman trading with Choctaws borrowed the word directly or via Mobilian Jargon	by 1812	William S. Wyman	August 1885	The form is a verbal suffix "indeed, contrary to your supposition" with modern spelling -okii. Wyman suggested Andrew Jackson had learnt "O.K." from Choctaw and introduced it in the East; others suggest an 18th-century origin.
Choctaw	si Hoka ('meaning "that's me" or "that's what I said"')	Learned by Andrew Jackson from Pushmataha	by 1812	William H. Murray	1931	Pushmataha was a Choctaw chief who fought under Jackson at the Battle of New Orleans and the Battle of Horseshoe Bend.
Wolof	waaw-kay (waaw "yes" + emphatic -kay)	Introduced by West African slaves	by 1815	David Dalby	1969	First proposed in the Hans Wolff Memorial Lecture. Dalby did not specify Wolof, suggesting also Mandinka o ke ("that's it", "certainly"; also "do it").
Mandinka	o ke ("that's it", "certainly"; also "do it")	Introduced by West African slaves	by 1815	David Dalby	1969	First proposed in the Hans Wolff Memorial Lecture.
Djabo	O'-ke	Introduced by West African slaves	by 1800	Charles Blooah	1937	Liberian Charles Blooah had noted the similarity of Djabo affirmative O'-ke in 1937 without asserting any causality.
Unknown	kay	Introduced by West African slaves	by 1784	' North Carolina enslaved person '	1784	A particle "kay" is attested from a person enslaved in North Carolina in 1784, seeking to avoid being flogged.
English	Initials of "oll korrect"	Coined by humorist Josh Billings	1860s or 1870s	"Callisthenes"	1935	Proposed in an advertisement in The Times for Selfridges; "Mr. Selfridge" purportedly remembered having read Billings as a boy.
English	Initials of "oll korrect"	Misspelling by Andrew Jackson	c. 1830	James Gordon Bennett, Sr.	30 March 1840	Bennett's story, a fabricated anecdote, is the first attribution of "O.K." to Jackson, although the quality of Jackson's spelling had already been debated during the 1828 presidential election. Charles Godfrey Leland claimed in 1889 to have heard the Jackson-misspelling story in 1835.
English	Initials of "oll korrect"	Misspelling by Thomas Daniels	15 September 1840			Daniels painted a banner reading "The people is Oll Korrect" displayed at a rally for William Henry Harrison in Urbana, Ohio. H. L. Mencken described this as "the story generally credited" as the origin until earlier uses were discovered in the 1930s. Daniel Leffel, owner of the Sugar Grove tavern on the National Road outside Springfield, Ohio, erected a prominent "O.K." sign after reading about Daniels' banner.
English	Initials of "oll korrect"	Misspelling by John Jacob Astor	c.1800	Eliezer Edward	1881	
English	Initials of "oll korrect"	Popularized by James Pyle based on Andrew Jackson usage	1862	New York Times obituary	1900	James Pyle, inventor of "Pyle's Pearline" purchased by Procter & Gamble in 1914 and renamed "Ivory Snow," placed an ad in the New York Times, October 23, 1862 which refers to James Pyle's O.K. Soap. The New York Times obituary of James Pyle dated January 21, 1900 says "Brought O.K. Into Popularity." The obituary states "He was the first to utilize in advertisements the letters OK in their business significance of all correct. He had the original use of these letters by Stonewall Jackson as an endorsement and was struck by their catchiness. By his extensive employment of them he probably did more than any other person to raise them to the dignity of a popular term and an established business institution."
English	Misspelling of "O.R." for "Order Received"	A common mistake in the Western U.S. owing to the similar shapes of the letters R and K.	by 1790	Albigence Waldo Putnam	1859	The 1790 bill of sale "Andrew Jackson, Esq., proved a bill of sale from Hugh McGary to Gasper Mansker for a negro man, which was O.K." is cited in Putnam's History of Middle Tennessee; the assertion that the misspelling is common is added in James Parton's 1860 Life of Andrew Jackson. Woodford Heflin in 1941 established that the 1790 bill did in fact read "O.R." rather than "O.K."
German	Initials of "Ohne Korrectur" [sic] (German for "No changes")	The term OK was used by typesetters and people working in the publishing business. A manuscript that didn't need any changes or corrections would be marked "O.K." for Ohne Korrectur [sic] (German for "No changes").	c. 1900	Guido Carreras	June 30, 1941	In Newsweek.
English	Initials of "O'Kelly" or "Obediah Kelly"	An early railroad agent or engineer certifying bills or deliveries.			by 1933	
German	Initials of Otto Kaiser	An industrialist certifying his factory's produce for shipping			by 1953	Reported in 1953 to be widely believed in Germany.
Greek	Initials of Ὅλα Καλά (Ola Kala, "everything is fine")	Used by Greek teachers marking students' work. Prominence of Greek shipping would allow it to be spread by sailors		John Alfred Huybers	1913	In the editor's preface to When I was a boy in Greece, by George Demetrios. Louise Pound supported the theory for a time.
Greek	Initials of Ὅλα Καλά (Ola Kala, "everything is well").	An abbreviation used by Greek immigrants in United States in the late 1800s, when sending telegrams to their relatives in Greece to keep the cost low.	late 19th century			
Byzantine Greek	och, och (ὤχ, ὤχ)	A magical incantation against fleas	c.920	W. Snow	26 October 1939	ὤχ, ὤχ occurs in the Geoponica, 13.15.9. Suggested in a letter to The Times.
French	au(x) quai(s) ("to the dock(s)")	Said of cotton bales accepted for export from New Orleans	by 1803		by 1961	Martin R. Wall wrote in 1963 that he had been told this in France "several years ago".
French	au(x) quai(s) ("on the quay(s)")	stencilled on Puerto Rican rum specially selected for export			before 1953	A conflation of the au quai and Aux Cayes theories.
French	au(x) quai(s) ("on the quay(s)")	In the American Revolutionary War, of French sailors making appointments with American girls	1780s	"Beachcomber"	28 June 1940	In the Daily Express.
French	Aux Cayes ("from Les Cayes, Haiti")	Les Cayes is a port from which high-quality rum was exported			by 1905	
German	Initials of Ober Kommando (High Command)	Used by Friedrich Wilhelm von Steuben, inspector general of the Continental Army the American Revolutionary War endorsing letters and orders	1780s		23 January 1938	German article reprinted in the Omaha Tribune. Giving a similar story in a letter to The Times in 1939, Sir Anthony Palmer used the name "General Schliessen" and phrase Oberst Kommandant ("colonel in command").
English	Initials of "Open Key"	A global telegraph signal meaning "ready to transmit"	"1861 or 1862"		By 1882	The telegraph was not invented until 1844. A contemporary news report of the 1866 transatlantic telegraph cable says "The following telegram has been received from Mr. R. A. Glass, Managing Director of the Telegraph Construction and Maintenance Company (Limited) :— 'O.K.,' (all correct)."
Finnish	oikea ("correct")				July 1940	In Cleveland Public Library Main Library News Notes.
English	Initials of Onslow and Kilbracken	On bills reviewed by the Lord Chairman of Committees of the House of Lords (Onslow) and his counsel (Kilbracken)	(after 1932)	John Godley	1939	A jocular proposal by Kilbracken's son, then a student, in a letter to The Times in response to Sir Anthony Palmer's earlier letter.
Latin	Initials of Omnis Correcta ("all correct"), with the K replacing the C	Used by early schoolmasters marking examination papers			1935	In a letter in The Vancouver Sun.
English	Initials of "outer keel"	Each timber in a wooden-hulled ship would be marked; "O.K. No 1" was the first timber to be laid		John D. Forbes	by 1936	
English	hoacky or horkey	Name for the harvest festival in eastern England		Wilfred White	7 March 1935	Suggested in an article in the Daily Telegraph. The phrase "hocky cry" is attested from 1555.
English	Initials of Orrin Kendall (The letters OK were stamped on each biscuit)	Suppliers of high-quality biscuits to the Union War Department during the American Civil War.	(after 1861)		16 December 1910	Article in the Chicago Record Herald.
Old English	hogfor ("seaworthy")	Shortened to HG, then pronounced by Norwegian and Danish sailors as hah gay.		Frank Colby	21 March 1943	Colby reported the theory in his syndicated column "Take My Word For It", but did not endorse it.
English	Initials of 0K "Zero Killed"	In military dispatches after a battle or combat mission in which no casualties had been suffered		Leon Godchaux	2 March 1981	In a letter to Time.
English	Initials of King's Observatory, Kew	Stamped on timepieces and instruments certified by the Observatory	1878	Lorah Harris Graham	1950	In fact, the stamp was "KO" rather than "OK", although the actual symbol comprised an ornate "O" and "K" superimposed, and it was described as "OK" in an 1884 almanac.
Occitan	oc ("yes")	Introduced by colonists in French Louisiana		F. R. H. McLellan	14 December 1953	In The Daily Telegraph.
Scots	och aye ("ah, yes")	Scottish immigrants to North America		"Barbarian"	15 October 1933	In a letter in The Observer.
Ulster Scots	och aye ("ah, yes")	Brought by Scotch-Irish American immigrants	"18th [or] early 19th" century	Mary Degges	October 1975	A variant of the och, aye theory Degges heard in Belfast; the Ulster pronunciation is purportedly closer to "OK" than the Scottish equivalent.
French	O qu'oui ("ah, yes")	Emphatic form of "yes"	by 1768	William McDevitt	by 1945	O qu'oui occurs in A Sentimental Journey Through France and Italy by Laurence Sterne.
English	Initials of "Old Keokuk"	The Sac chief signed treaties with these initials	by 1830		by 1890	The theory was mentioned but not endorsed by the Century Dictionary in 1890.
French	Misspelled initials of au courant	In a poem by "Hans Breitmann", semi-educated German immigrant created by humorist Charles Godfrey Leland	by 1865		1868	Breitmann's poems appeared during the U.S. Civil War; the glossary to the 1868 British edition equates "O.K." with au courant.
English	Opposite of KO "knockout"				by 1981	Cited by Allan Pease.
