= Intensifier =

Linguistic modifier which enhances the word it modifies

In linguistics, an intensifier (abbreviated int) is a lexical category (but not a traditional part of speech) for a modifier that makes no contribution to the propositional meaning of a clause but serves to enhance and give additional emotional context to the lexical item it modifies. Intensifiers are grammatical expletives, specifically expletive attributives (or, equivalently, attributive expletives or attributive-only expletives; they also qualify as expressive attributives), because they function as semantically vacuous filler. Characteristically, English draws intensifiers from a class of words called degree modifiers, words that quantify the idea they modify. More specifically, they derive from a group of words called adverbs of degree, also known as degree adverbs. When used grammatically as intensifiers, these words cease to be degree adverbs, because they no longer quantify the idea they modify; instead, they emphasize it emotionally. By contrast, the words moderately, slightly, and barely are degree adverbs, but not intensifiers. The other hallmark of prototypical intensifiers is that they are adverbs which lack the primary characteristic of adverbs: the ability to modify verbs. Intensifiers modify exclusively adjectives and adverbs, but this rule is insufficient to classify intensifiers, since there exist other words commonly classified as adverbs that never modify verbs but are not intensifiers, e.g. questionably.

For these reasons, Huddleston argues that intensifier not be recognized as a primary grammatical or lexical category. Intensifier is a category with grammatical properties, but insufficiently defined unless its functional significance is also described (what Huddleston calls a notional definition).

Technically, intensifiers roughly qualify a point on the affective semantic property, which is gradable. Syntactically, intensifiers pre-modify either adjectives or adverbs. Semantically, they increase the emotional content of an expression. The basic intensifier is very. A versatile word, English permits very to modify adjectives and adverbs, but not verbs. Other intensifiers often express the same intention as very.

== Examples of English intensifiers ==
- amazingly
- -ass, as in "a sweet-ass ride"
- astoundingly
- awful, as in "awful good"
- bare, as in "bare jokes" (slang)
- bloody, as in "bloody hell"
- crazy
- dead, as in "dead sexy" or "dead wrong"
- dreadfully
- colossally
- especially
- exceptionally
- excessively
- extremely, as in "extremely huge"
- extraordinarily
- fantastically
- frightfully
- fucking, as in "fucking awesome"
- fully
- hella, as in "hella good" (slang)
- incredibly
- insanely
- li'l
- literally
- mad (slang)
- mightily
- most, as in "Most Reverend"
- outrageously
- phenomenally
- precious, as in "precious little"
- quite, as in "quite good"
- radically
- rather, as in "rather than"
- real, as in "real nice"
- really, as in "really cool"
- remarkably
- ridiculously
- right, as in "that's right"
- sick, as in "sick and tired (of something)"
- so, see also so (sentence closer)
- somewhat
- strikingly
- super
- supremely
- surpassingly
- terribly
- terrifically
- too, as in "too much" or "too late"
- totally, as in "totally different"
- veritable
- very, as in "very bad"
- wicked, as in "wicked cool" (regional)

== Syntax ==
Not all intensifiers are the same syntactically since they vary on whether they can be used attributively or predicatively. For example, really and super can be used in both ways:

a. The car is really expensive. - Predicative intensifier
b. the really expensive car - Attributive intensifier
a. Today was super cold. - Predicative intensifier
b. a super cold day - Attributive intensifier

Words such as so can occur only as predicative intensifiers, and others, such as -ass, typically are used only as attributive intensifiers:

a. The car is so expensive. - Predicative intensifier
b. *the so expensive car (Note: This article uses asterisks to indicate ungrammatical examples.) - Attributive intensifier (not grammatically correct, not used)
a. *Today was cold-ass. - Predicative intensifier (not grammatically correct, not used) (Note: The exception is badass, which appears to be the source of this intensifier, rather than an instance of it.)
b. a cold-ass day - Attributive intensifier

There is dialectal variation in the "correctness" of certain forms.

== Illocutionary force ==
An intensifier expressly provides an emotional characterization of a lexical item for the benefit of a reader or listener. A speaker or writer's use of the characterization encourages a reader or listener to consider and begin to feel the underlying emotion.

== Persuasiveness and credibility ==
=== Legal ===
In general, overuse of intensifiers negatively affects the persuasiveness or credibility of a legal argument. However, if a judge's authoritative written opinion uses a high rate of intensifiers, a lawyer's written appeal of that opinion that also uses a high rate of intensifiers is associated with an increase in favorable outcomes for such appeals. Also, when judges disagree with each other in writing, they tend to use more intensifiers.

=== Business ===
A 2010 Stanford Graduate School of Business study found that, in quarterly earnings conference calls, deceptive CEOs use a greater percent quantity of "extreme positive emotions words" than do CEOs telling the truth. That finding agrees with the presumption that CEOs attempting to hide poor performance exert themselves more forcefully to persuade their listeners. David F. Larcker and Zakolyukinaz give a list of 115 extreme positive emotions words, including intensifiers: awful, deucedly, emphatically, excellently, fabulously, fantastically, genuinely, gloriously, immensely, incredibly, insanely, keenly, madly, magnificently, marvelously, splendidly, supremely, terrifically, truly, unquestionably, wonderfully, very [good].

A 2013 Forbes Magazine article about counterproductive modes of expression in English specifically discouraged use of really and observed that it provokes doubt and degrades the speaker's credibility: "'Really' – Finder calls this a 'poor attempt to instill candor and truthfulness' that makes clients and coworkers question whether you're really telling the truth."

== Quotes ==
Philosopher Friedrich Nietzsche, in Human, All Too Human (1878), wrote:

The narrator. It is easy to tell whether a narrator is narrating because the subject matter interests him or because he wants to evoke interest through his narrative. If the latter is the case, he will exaggerate, use superlatives, etc. Then he usually narrates the worse, because he is not thinking so much about the story as about himself.

A quote often attributed to Mark Twain but probably by newspaper editor William Allen White is "Substitute 'damn' every time you're inclined to write 'very'; your editor will delete it and the writing will be just as it should be."

== See also ==
- Comparison (grammar)
- Do-support
- Intensive pronoun
- Intensive word form
- So (sentence closer)
