= UHH =

UHH or Uhh can refer to:

- A filler in many languages and dialects
- University of Hawaii at Hilo, United States
- University of Hamburg, Germany
- Unhexhexium (Uhh), a hypothesised chemical element
