= Formulaic language =

Utterances with fixed forms and often non-literal meaning

Formulaic language (previously known as automatic speech or embolalia) is a linguistic term for verbal expressions that are fixed in form, often non-literal in meaning, with attitudinal nuances, and closely related to communicative-pragmatic context.

Along with idioms, expletives, and proverbs, formulaic language includes pause fillers (e.g., "Like", "Er", or "Uhm") and conversational speech formulas (e.g., "You've got to be kidding", "Excuse me?", or "Hang on a minute").

== Background ==
The word embolalia comes from the Greek word embolos which means 'something thrown in', from the word emballo- meaning 'to throw in', and -lalia meaning 'speech, chattering and babbling; abnormal or disordered form of speech.

Modern linguists led by Leonard Bloomfield in 1933 call these "hesitation forms", the sounds of stammering (uh), stuttering (um, um), throat-clearing (ahem!), stalling (well, um, that is), interjected when the speaker is groping for words or at a loss for the next thought.

French psychiatrist Jules Séglas, on the other hand, defined the term embolalia as "the regular addition of prefixes or suffixes to words" and mentioned that the behavior is sometimes used by normal individuals to demonstrate to their interlocutors that they are paying attention to the conversation.

Harry Levin and Irene Silverman called formulaic language "vocal segregates" in their 1965 paper on hesitation phenomena and found that from their experiments on children these segregates seem to be less voluntary hesitation phenomena and may be signs of uncontrolled emotionality under stress.

The Irish poet William Butler Yeats argued for formulaic language experiments with his wife, which provided him with symbols for his poetry as well as literary theories.

== Characteristics ==
=== Linguistic features ===
==== Definition of formulaic sequences ====
According to The Canadian Modern Language Review, formulaic sequences are "fixed combinations of words that ... can facilitate fluency in speech by making pauses shorter and less frequent, and allowing longer runs of speech between pauses".

A formulaic sequence is "a sequence, continuous or discontinuous, of words or other elements, which is, or appears to be, prefabricated: that is, stored and retrieved whole from memory at the time of use, rather than being subject to generation or analysis by the language grammar."

They can be found everywhere in language use and "make up a large proportion of any discourse". Formulaic sequences can be of any length and can be used to express messages, functions, social solidarity and process information very fast without communication misunderstanding.

==== Morphology and phonology ====
Filled pauses

Filled pauses consist of repetitions of syllables and words, reformulation or false starts where speakers rephrase their speech to fit the representation they best perceive, grammatical repairs, and partial repeats that often involve searching for the right words in one's lexicon to carry across an intended meaning. There are basically three distinct forms for filled pauses: (i) an elongated central vowel only; (ii) a nasal murmur only; and (iii) a central vowel followed by a nasal murmur. Although a schwa-like quality [ə:] appears to be the most commonly used, some speakers consistently using the neutral vowel [ɨ:] instead, while others may use both vowels in the same sentence, depending on the quality of the previous word's last vowel. Filled pauses vocalizations may be built around central vowels and speakers may differ in their preferences, but they do not appear to behave as other words in the language. The lengthening of words ending in a coronal fricative, for instance, could be obtained by prolonging the entire rhyme and/or the fricative only. Most of the time, however, the neutral vowel [ɨ:] is appended to achieve the desired effect.

Prolonged pauses

Similarly to filled pauses, single occurrences of prolonged pauses occurring between stretches of fluent speech, may be preceded and followed by silent pauses, as they most often occur on function words with a CV or V structure. Even though they are not always central, the vowels of such syllables may be as long as the ones observed for filled pauses.

Retraced and unretraced restarts

Riggenbach's 1991 study of fluency development in Chinese learners of English had an analysis of repair phenomena, which included retraced restarts and unretraced restarts. Retraced restarts refer to the reformulations whereby a portion of the original utterance is duplicated. They can either involve repetition, that is, the precise adjacent duplication of a sound, syllable, word or phrase, or insertion, which refers to a retraced restart with the addition of new unretraced lexical items. Conversely, unretraced restarts refer to reformulations that reject the original utterance, similarly known as false starts.

==== Semantics and pragmatics ====
The semantics of formulaic language have often been debated on, and to date, there lacks a consensus on whether or not filler words are intentional in speech and whether or not they should be considered as words or if they are simply side effects of difficulties in the planning process of speech by speakers. Bailey & Ferriera's (2007) paper found that there is little evidence to suggest that the use of filler words are intentional in speech and that they should not be considered as words in the conventional sense.

Filler words can be non-lexical or lexical. "Non-lexical fillers" are those recognized as not being words, "lexical fillers" as ones that are, but neither is thought to contain much semantic information. However, some filler words are used to express certain speech acts. "Yeah" (lexical) is used to give affirmation, introduce a new topic, show the speaker's perception and understanding, or when the speaker's continuing after a speech management problem flounders completely. Fillers like "Mmmm" (non-lexical) and "Well" (lexical) signal the listener's understanding of the information provided.

Research has shown that people were less likely to use formulaic language in general topics and domains they were better versed in because they were more adept at selecting the appropriate terms. To date, there is insufficient research to say whether fillers are a part of integral meaning or an aspect of performance, but we can say they are useful in directing the listener's attention.

==== Syntax ====
Formulaic language is more likely to occur at the beginning of utterance or phrase possibly because of greater demand on planning processes at these junctures. Features of formulaic language, like filled pauses or repetitions, are most likely to occur immediately prior to the onset of a complex syntactic constituent. Filled pauses are also likely after the initial word in a complex constituent, especially after function words. Therefore, listeners might be able to use the presence of a recent filled pause by resolving an ambiguous structure in favor of a more complex analysis.

There are several different types of formulaic language. One type is relatively universal, often transcending differences in language and to some degree culture. Simple fillers like "Uhm", "Uh", or "Er" are used by many different people in many different settings. For the most part, these types of fillers are considered innocuous, and are often overlooked by listeners, as long as they are not utilized so often that they overshadow the remainder of the conversation.

Other forms of formulaic language are ingrained within specific cultures, and in fact are sometimes considered an identifying characteristic of people who share a particular religion, or live in a specific geographical region. Along with accents, formulaic language of this type is sometimes considered colorful and somewhat entertaining. Writers often make use of this type of speech to give the characters in their writings additional personality, helping to make them unique.

Fluency

The study conducted by Dechert (1980) that investigated the speech performance of a German student of English revealed that there is a tendency for speech pauses to be situated at breaks that are consistent with "episodic units". Dechert (1980) found that the more fluent utterances exhibited more pauses at those junctures and lesser within the "episodic units", leading him to posit that the study subject was able to use the narrative structure to pace his own speech with natural breaks in order for him to scout for the words and phrases that are to follow subsequently.

Through the comparison of the story retelling utterances collated of second language learners, Lennon (1984) discovered notable disparities in the distribution of pauses between recounting in the research subjects' first and second languages respectively. The study found that, in their first language, all the pauses were found to be located either at clause breaks or following nonintegral components of the clause, without pauses within the clauses. On the other hand, the narrators who spoke using their second language exhibited different patterns, with a higher frequency of pauses occurring within the clauses, leading to the conclusion posited by Lennon to be that the speakers seem to be "planning within clauses as well as in suprasegmental units", and hence, the occurrence of pauses within clauses and not at the intersection of clauses could well be an indicator distinguishing fluent and confluent speech.

=== Discourse features ===
==== Cognitive load ====
Cognitive load is an important predictor of formulaic language. More disfluency is found in longer utterances and when the topic is unfamiliar. In Wood's book, he suggested that when a high degree of cognitive load occurs, such as during expository speech or impromptu descriptions of complex interrelated topics, even native speakers can suffer from disfluency.

==== Speech rate ====
Formulaic phrases are uttered more quickly than comparable non-formulaic phrases. Speech rate is closely related to cognitive load. Depending on the cognitive load, the rates of a speaker's utterances are produced either faster or slower, in comparison to a fixed speaking rate which happens usually. For example, speech rate becomes slower when having to make choices that are not anticipated, and tend to accelerate when words are being repeated. In fast conditions, cognitive processes that result in a phonetic plan, fail to keep up with articulation, and thus, the articulation of the existing plan is restarted, resulting in the repetition of words which is more likely to happen but no more likely than fillers.

==== Frequency of words ====
In Beattie and Butterworth's (1979) study, low frequency content words and those rated as contextually improbable were preceded by hesitations such as fillers. Speakers, when choosing to use low frequency words in their speech, are aware, and are more likely to be disfluent. This is further supported by Schnadt and Corley where they found that prolongations and fillers increased in words just before multiple-named or low frequency items.

==== Domain (addressor vs. addressee) ====
Humans are found to be more disfluent overall when addressing other humans than when addressing machines. More instances of formulaic language is found in dialogues than in monologues. The different roles the addresser played (such as a sister, a daughter or a mother) greatly influences the numbers of disfluencies, particularly, fillers produced, regardless of length or complexity.

== Functions ==
=== Comprehension cues ===
There is a common agreement that disfluencies are accompanied by important modifications both at the segmental and prosodic levels and that speakers and listeners use such cues systematically and meaningfully. Thus they appear as linguistic universal devices that are similar to other devices and are controlled by the speaker and regulated by language specific constraints. In addition, speech disfluencies such as fillers can help listeners to identify upcoming words.

While formulaic language can serve as a useful cue that more is to come, some people do develop an unconscious dependence on these filler words. When this is the case, it is necessary to correct the problem by making the speaker be aware of their over-reliance on formulaic language production and by training the person to make more efficient use of other verbal strategies. As the individual gains confidence and is less apt to have a need for filler words, the predilection toward formulaic language is then able to gradually diminish.

A study done by Foxtree (2001) showed that both English and Dutch listeners were faster to identify words in a carrier sentence when it was preceded with an "Uh" instead of without an "Uh", which suggested that different fillers have different effects as they might be conveying different information.

Fischer and Brandt-Pook also found out that discourse particles mark thematic breaks, signal the relatedness between the preceding and following utterance, indicate if the speaker has understood the content communicated, and support the formulation process by signalling possible problems in speech management.

While fillers might give listeners cues about the information being conveyed, Bailey & Ferreira's study made a distinction between "Good Cues" and "Bad Cues" in facilitating listener's comprehension. A "Good Cue" leads the listener to correctly predict the onset of a new constituent (Noun Phrase, Verb Phrase), whereas a "Bad Cue" leads the listener to incorrectly predict the onset of a new constituent. "Good Cue" make it easier for listeners to process the information they have been presented while "Bad Cue" make it harder for listeners process the relevant information.

There is strong empirical evidence that speakers use formulaic language in similar ways across languages and that formulaic language plays a fundamental role in the structuring of spontaneous speech, as they are used to achieve a better synchronization between interlocutors by announcing upcoming topic changes, delays related to planning load or preparedness problems, as well as speaker's intentions to take/give the floor or to revise/abandon an expression he/she had already presented.

=== Communicative goals ===
A study conducted by Clark and Foxtree (2002) mentioned that parts of formulaic language, such as fillers, serve a communicative function and are considered integral to the information the speaker tries to convey, although they do not add to the propositional content or the primary message. Instead, they are considered part of a collateral message where the speaker is commenting on her performance. Speakers produce filled pauses (e.g. "Uh" or "Um") for a variety of reasons, including the intention to discourage interruptions or to gain additional time to plan utterances.

Another communicative goal includes the attention-impelling function, which explores another purpose of hesitation forms as being to dissociate oneself slightly from the harsh reality of what is to follow. With the use of a beat of time filled with a meaningless interjection, uncommitted people who are "into distancing" make use of such formulaic language to create a little distance between themselves and their words, as if it might lessen the impact of their words.

However, not all forms of formulaic language are considered appropriate or harmless. There are examples of formulaic language production that lean towards being offensive, for instance, the use of anything considered to be profanity within a given culture.

In this form, the speech is usually the insertion of swear words within the sentence structure used to convey various ideas. At times, this use of formulaic language comes about due to the individual being greatly distressed or angry. However, there are situations where swear words are inserted unconsciously even if the individual is extremely happy. When the use of swear words is called to the attention of the individual, he or she may not even have been aware of the usage of such formulaic language.

== Neurological basis ==
=== Medical cases ===
==== Aphasia ====
Many patients who suffer from aphasia retain the ability to produce formulaic language, including conversational speech formulas and swear words—in some cases, patients are unable to create words or sentences, but they are able to swear. Also, the ability to pronounce other words can change and evolve during the process of recovery, while pronunciation and use of swear words remain unchanged.

Patients who are affected by transcortical sensory aphasia, a rare form of aphasia, have been found to exhibit formulaic language that is characterised by "lengthy chunks of memorized material".

==== Apraxia of speech ====
Apraxia of speech can also occur in conjunction with dysarthria (muscle weakness affecting speech production) or aphasia (language difficulties related to neurological damage).

One of the articulatory characteristics of apraxia of speech found in adults includes speech behavior that "exhibits fewer errors with formulaic language than volitional speech". Developmental verbal dyspraxia has also been found to have more effect on volitional speech than on formulaic language.

The characteristics of apraxia of speech include difficulties in imitating speech sounds, imitating no-speech movements, such as sticking out the tongue, groping for sounds, and in severe cases, the inability to produce any sounds, inconsistent errors and a slow rate of speech. However, patients who suffer from apraxia of speech may retain the ability to produce formulaic language, such as "thank you" or "how are you?". Apraxia of speech can also occur in conjunction with dysarthria, an illness which inflicts muscle weakness affecting speech production, or aphasia, which causes language difficulties related to neurological damage.

==== Developmental coordination disorder ====
Developmental coordination disorder is a chronic neurological disorder that affects the voluntary movements of speech. Children with developmental coordination disorder are unable to formulate certain kinds of voluntary speech; however, they may speak set words or phrases spontaneously, constituting formulaic language—although they may not be able to repeat them on request.

== See also ==
- Automatic writing
- Glossolalia
