= Pick-up line =

Romantic conversation opener

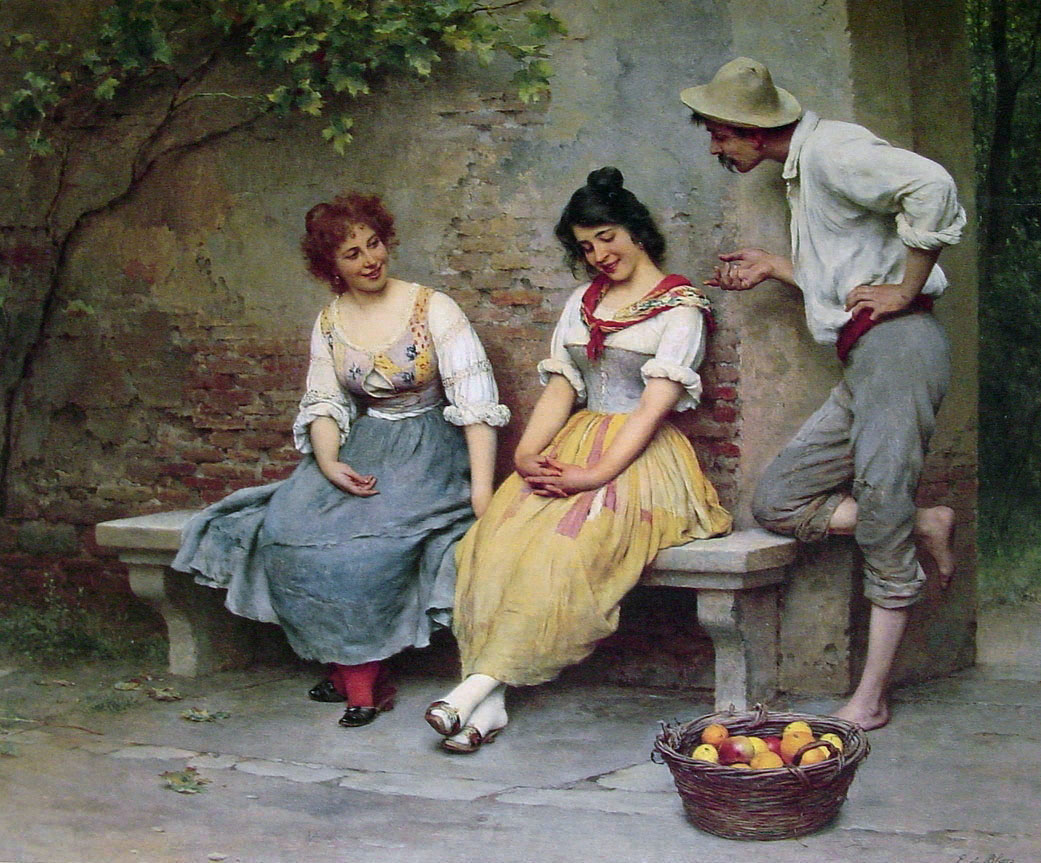
The Flirtation by Eugene de Blaas.

A pick-up line or chat-up line is a conversation opener with the intent of engaging a person for romance or dating. As overt and sometimes humorous displays of romantic interest, pick-up lines advertise the wit of their speakers to their target listeners.

Pick-up lines range from straightforward conversation openers such as introducing oneself, providing information about oneself, or asking someone about their likes and common interests, to more elaborate attempts including flattery or humor.

== See also ==
- Flirting
- Limerence
- Pickup artist
- Romance (love)
- Wit
