= Lingual sounds =

A lingual sound may be a:

- Coronal consonant
- Lingual ingressive consonant
