= Speech disfluency =

Category of speech including interrupted utterances or filler words

A speech disfluency, also spelled speech dysfluency, is any of various breaks, irregularities, or non-lexical vocables which occur within the flow of otherwise fluent speech. These include "false starts", i.e. words and sentences that are cut off mid-utterance; phrases that are restarted or repeated, and repeated syllables; "fillers", i.e. grunts, and non-lexical or semiarticulate utterances such as uh, erm, um, and hmm, and, in English, well, so, I mean, and like; and "repaired" utterances, i.e. instances of speakers correcting their own slips of the tongue or mispronunciations (before anyone else gets a chance to).

== Definition ==
A disfluence or nonfluence is a non-pathological hesitance when speaking, the use of fillers ("like" or "uh"), or the repetition of a word or phrase. This needs to be distinguished from a fluency disorder like stuttering with an interruption of fluency of speech, accompanied by "excessive tension, speaking avoidance, struggle behaviors, and secondary mannerism".

== Fillers ==
Fillers are parts of speech which are not generally recognized as purposeful or containing formal meaning, usually expressed as pauses such as uh, like and er, but also extending to repairs ("He was wearing a black—uh, I mean a blue, a blue shirt"), and articulation problems such as stuttering. Use is normally frowned upon in mass media such as news reports or films, but they occur regularly in everyday conversation, sometimes representing upwards of 20% of "words" in conversation. Fillers can also be used as a pause for thought ("I arrived at, um—3 o'clock"), and when used in this function are called hesitation markers or planners.

== Language-dependence ==
Research in computational linguistics has revealed a correlation between native language and patterns of disfluencies in spontaneously uttered speech. Besides that research, there are other subjective accounts reported by individuals.

According to one commentator, Americans use pauses such as um or em, the Irish commonly use the pause em, the British say uh or eh, the French use euh, the Germans say äh (pronounced eh or er), the Dutch use eh, Japanese use ああ ā, あのう anō or ええと ēto, the Spanish say ehhh (also used in Hebrew) and como (normally meaning 'like'), and Latin Americans but not the Spanish use este (normally meaning 'this'). Besides er and uh, the Portuguese use hã or é.

In Mandarin, 那个; nà gè and 这个; zhè ge are used, meaning 'that' or 'this', respectively. Arabic speakers say يعني, the pronunciation of which is close to yaa'ni, [jæʕni] or [jaʕni], (literally 'he means'; there is no grammatical gender-neutral third person) and Turkish say şey in addition to yani (without the [ʕ] found in Arabic) and ııı.

Despite the differences between languages, pause fillers in different languages often sound similar because they tend to be the easiest and most neutral vowel sounds to make (such as the schwa), i.e., the sounds that can be pronounced with a relaxed tongue or jaw.

== Research ==
Recent linguistic research has suggested that non-pathological disfluencies may contain a variety of meanings; the frequency of uh and um in English is often reflective of a speaker's alertness or emotional state. Some have hypothesized that the time of an uh or um is used for the planning of future words; other researchers have suggested that they are actually to be understood as full-fledged function words rather than accidents, indicating a delay of variable time in which the speaker wishes to pause without voluntarily yielding control of the dialogue. There is some debate as to whether to consider them a form of noise or as a meaning-filled part of language, but disfluency can improve language understanding by signalling that the speaker may be about to say something new or complex.

== Hmm ==
Hmm is an exclamation (an emphatic interjection) typically used to express reflection, uncertainty, thoughtful absorption, or hesitation. Hmm is technically categorized as an interjection, like um, huh, ouch, erm, and wow. The first h-sound is a mimic for breathing out, and the second m-sound, since the mouth is closed, is representing that the person is not currently sure what to say (erm and um are used similarly). The pause filler indicates that the person is temporarily speechless, but still engaged in thought. The variety of tones, pitches, and lengths used add nuances in meaning.

=== Etymology ===
The expression is used in many different languages; however, the origin of hmm is difficult to find, mainly because "the word is so natural that it may have arisen at any time", as highlighted by Anatoly Liberman, a linguist at the University of Minnesota and an expert on word origins. It is possible Neanderthals might have used hmm. Nicholas Christenfeld, a psychologist at the University of California, San Diego, and an expert on filled pauses, attests hmm is popular largely since it is such a neutral sound and that "it's easier to say than anything else". The earliest attestations of hmm are from Shakespeare, "I cried hum ... But markt him not a word" (1598 Shakespeare Henry IV, Pt. 1 iii. i. 154). It may be a vocable that grew out of lexicalized throat-clearing.

=== Use as a filler word ===
Hmm is a "filler" word, like um and er. Typically, hmm is uttered when the person is being especially conscious about whom they are talking with, and as a result are thinking deeply about what to say. Moreover, the use of hmm is often interactional and cognitive. The interactional function is to do with politeness: if someone is invited to a party and responds "no" without a filled pause, they might appear rude, but a reply of "Hmm, sorry, no" might appear much more polite, as it seems the speaker is giving the offer some thought, rather than abruptly declining.

=== Thoughtful absorption ===
The use of hmm is typically used during "thoughtful absorption", which is when one is engrossed in their flow of ideas and associations, that lead to a reality-oriented conclusion. The utterance of hmm is key for listeners to understand that the speaker is currently engaged in thought; if the speaker thought silently instead, listeners may be unsure if the speaker had finished their utterance. Um and er are also used during thoughtful absorption; however, typically the extent of the absorption of thought is more limited since um and er are usually spoken mid-sentence and for shorter periods of time than hmm. For this reason, thoughtful absorption is typically associated with the utterance of hmm.

== See also ==
- Aizuchi
- Aphasia
- Auditory processing disorder
- Discourse marker
- Epanorthosis
- Natural language processing
- Speech and language impairment
- Speech disorders
- Speech-language pathology
- Speech perception
- Speech recognition
- Stuttering
