= Phatic expression =

Utterances which primarily serve a social function

In linguistics, a phatic expression (English: /ˈfætɪk/, FAT-ik) is a communication which primarily serves to establish or maintain social relationships. In other words, phatic expressions have mostly socio-pragmatic rather than semantic functions. They can be observed in everyday conversational exchanges, as in, for instance, exchanges of social pleasantries that do not seek or offer information of intrinsic value but rather signal willingness to observe conventional local expectations for politeness.

Other uses of the term include the category of "small talk" (conversation for its own sake) in speech communication, where it is also called social grooming. In Roman Jakobson's typology of communication functions, the 'phatic' function of language concerns the channel of communication; for instance, when one says "I can't hear you, you're breaking up" in the middle of a cell-phone conversation. This usage appears in research on online communities and micro-blogging.

== Purpose ==
Phatic communication denotationally breaks Grice's conversational maxims, because it gives information that is unnecessary, untrue, or irrelevant; however, it has important connotational meanings that do not break these maxims and is best understood as an important part of language in its role in establishing, maintaining, and managing bonds of sociality between participants, as well as creating feelings of solidarity and familiarity, and putting participants at ease.

== History ==
The term phatic communion ('bonding by language') was coined by anthropologist Bronisław Malinowski in his essay "The Problem of Meaning in Primitive Languages", which appeared in 1923 as a supplementary contribution to The Meaning of Meaning by C. K. Ogden and I. A. Richards. The term phatic means 'linguistic' (i.e. 'by language') and comes from the Greek φατός phatós ('spoken, that may be spoken'), from φημί phēmí ('I speak, say').

== Importance of context ==
Many expressions generally considered to be phatic (see below) may be a genuine request for information in certain contexts. For example, in British English, "How are you?" is a phatic expression used when greeting someone one knows, especially when a participant wants to initiate conversation. However, it can also be asked sincerely, inferable from context, such as when a friend gives bad news, or tone, such falling intonation to show it as a genuine question (as is with w/h-word questions), or speaking more quietly. Authenticity of the question can also be emphasised by the addition of the word "feeling" ("How are you feeling?").

== Phatic expressions in various languages ==
=== Danish ===
Danish has several phatic greetings:

- Hvordan går det? 'how goes it?'. Possible answers are: Det går godt/fint 'it goes good/fine'.
- Hvor'n skær'en? 'how does it cut?' Informal greeting between close friends.
- Hvad så? 'what then?'. Similar to the English greeting what's up?. More often used in Jutland. A possible answer is Ikke så meget 'not that much'.
- Hej is a common informal greeting and equivalent to the English hi, pronounced almost the same. Single-word greetings with approximately the same meaning include hejsa (from combining hej with German sa from French ça), dav, davs (both reduced forms of dag meaning 'day'), goddag, halløj, halløjsa, halløjsovs (Pun greeting. Made by combining halløj and løgsovs 'onion sauce'), pænt goddag 'nice good day' is a more formal greeting.
- Hallo is only used when the speaker is not sure they can be heard. Examples when saying/yelling hallo is appropriate: Trying to find out if someone else is in a seemingly empty room/building; using it as an initial phone greeting; checking if the person you're calling can still hear you (when experiencing a bad phone connection); trying to get the attention of a listener that appears to not pay attention.
- Mojn is only used in Southern Jutland. It comes from North German moin from the German word Morgen meaning 'morning'. Despite its original meaning it is used as a greeting throughout the day.
- Hej hej or farvel are common ways to say goodbye. Vi ses 'we will see each other' is used as a farewell greeting in face-to-face conversations while vi snakkes 'we will speak each other'/vi snakkes ved 'we will speak to each other by' are used in both face-to-face and phone/text conversations.
- Kør forsigtigt 'drive safely' is said to a person leaving the place where the speaker is located and going to drive/bike to another location. Kom godt hjem 'come well home' is said in the same situation whatever the method of transportation.
- God arbejdslyst 'good lust for work' is said when parting with a person who is either currently at work or leaving to go to work.
- Tak for i dag 'thanks for today' is often said in more formal contexts of prolonged interactions like at the end of a meeting or the end of a class.
- Tak for sidst 'thanks for the last time that we were together' acknowledging that the people were together somewhere
- God bedring 'good recovery'. Said when leaving a sick person.
- Ha' det godt 'have it good' or du/I må ha det godt 'you (sg./pl.) may have it good' is a farewell phrase wishing for the other's well-being. A joke variant of this is Ha' det som I ser ud 'have it as you look' (literally: 'have it as you look out'). By not saying the expected adjective godt 'good', the speaker is violating the maxim of quantity and thereby inferring that they do not think the listener looks good. This can be understood as an insult and is therefore mainly used informally between friends.

Some phatic greetings are only used in writings such as letters, e-mails and speeches read aloud:

- Kære 'dear' followed by a name is a formalised way of beginning a letter, speech etc.
- Ways to end a letter or e-mail include hilsen 'greeting', (med) venlig hilsen '(with) friendly greeting', sometimes abbreviated to (m)vh. Others include med kærlig hilsen 'with loving greeting' abbreviated kh, knus 'hug'.

Some greetings like hej can be used throughout the day. Some are more specific, and the specific time of when to switch to the next greeting can vary from speaker to speaker. Time-specific greetings include Godmorgen ('good morning'), God formiddag (literally 'good pre-noon'), Goddag ('good day'), God eftermiddag ('good afternoon'), Godaften ('good evening'), and Godnat ('good night').

Ways of saying thanks include tak 'thanks', tak skal du have 'thanks shall you have', mange tak 'many thanks', tusind(e) tak 'thousand thanks', tak for det 'thanks for that' and jeg takker 'I thank'. A thanks can be answered with selv tak 'self thanks' or det var så lidt 'it was so little' (referring to the small amount of work that had to be done).

Other phatic expressions include Held og lykke ('luck and fortune'), equivalent to the English good luck, and Knæk og bræk ('crack and break') which has the same meaning as good luck similar to the English expression break a leg, mostly used by hunters, fishers, and theater crews.

=== English ===
"You're welcome", in its phatic usage, is not intended to convey the message that the hearer is welcome; it is a phatic response to being thanked, which in turn is a phatic whose function is to acknowledge the receipt of a benefit.

Similarly, the question "how are you?" is usually an automatic component of a social encounter. Although there are times when "how are you?" is asked in a sincere, concerned manner and does in fact anticipate a detailed response regarding the respondent's present state, this needs to be pragmatically inferred from context and intonation.

Example: a simple, basic exchange between two acquaintances in a non-formal environment:

Speaker one: "What's up?" (US English. In UK English this more commonly means "Is there something wrong?")
Speaker two: "Hey, how's it going?" (In US English "Hey" is equivalent to "Hi", or "Hello". Adding "How's it going" returns the initial greeting-query, paraphrased, without offering any information about what is possibly "up". In short, the first speaker's token is replied to with the second speaker's equivalent token, not actually answering the first speaker's literal query.)

Or:

Speaker one: "All right?" (UK English. In US English this can only be a tag question, approximately meaning "Do you agree with or accept what I've said?" In the US, the longer question "(Are) you all right?" can mean "Is something wrong?")
Speaker two: "Yeah, all right."

In both dialogues, neither speaker expects an actual answer to the question but rather it is an indication that each has recognized the other's presence and has therefore sufficiently performed that particular social duty.

=== Icelandic ===
There are several phatic greetings in Icelandic differing in formality:

- Hvað segirðu (gott)? 'What say you (good)?'. Equal to English how are you?. To a foreign speaker it can seem strange that the preferred answer, gott 'good', is embedded in the question. A preferred answer can be ég segi allt gott/fínt 'I say everything good/fine'
- Hvernig gengur? 'how goes?'.

Thanking:

- Takk fyrir 'thanks for'.

=== Japanese ===
In Japanese, phatic expressions play a significant role in communication, for instance the backchannel responses referred to as aizuchi. Other such expressions include the ubiquitous Yoroshiku onegaishimasu ('please treat me well', used before starting work with someone), Otsukaresama desu (lit. 'you must be tired', closer to 'thank you for your hard work'—used for leave-taking and sometimes as a greeting) and Osewa ni natte imasu ('thank you for your support').

=== Mandarin Chinese ===
In China, the phatic expression 吃饭了吗 (chīfàn le ma) 'have you eaten?' is equivalent to English speakers' how are you? Food culture is important in China and thus inquiring if one is well-fed implies the speaker's desire to know if the listener has this basic need met. This expression is most often used by older members of society toward younger people.

=== Persian ===
Taarof is a complex set of expressions and other gestures in Persian society, primarily reflected in the language.

=== Welsh ===
In Welsh, the general phatic is a regional and colloquial version of sut mae? ('how is?'). The general pronunciation in southern Wales is shw mae and in the North, su' mae. The usual answer is iawn ('OK') or, iawn, diolch' ('OK, thanks'), or maybe the more traditional go lew ('quite good'), go lew, diolch ('quite good, thanks'). Many native speakers do not answer like this, but simply say, shw mae? or su' mae? in response.

The use of sut mae phatic has been used as a Welsh language campaigners to encourage Welsh speakers to begin conversations in Welsh, and for non-fluent speakers to "give it a go". Shwmae Sumae Day was held for the first time in 2013 and is held annually on 13 October.

=== In fiction ===
Phatic expressions are often created by authors, particularly in science fiction or fantasy, as part of their worldbuilding.

- In A Song of Ice and Fire by George R. R. Martin, the people of Essos use the expression Valar Morghulis ('All men must die'), answered with Valar Dohaeris ('All men must serve').
- In the Star Wars series, "May the Force be with you" is used as a leave-taking phrase.
- In Star Trek, the expression "live long and prosper" is used phatically, accompanied by a Vulcan salute.
- In The Handmaid's Tale by Margaret Atwood, Blessed be the Fruit is a common greeting exchanged between the people of the Republic of Gilead, responded to with May the Lord open.

== Non-verbal phatic expressions ==
Non-verbal phatic expressions are used in nonverbal communication for emphasis or to add detail to the message that a person conveys or expresses. Common examples of these are smiling, gesturing, waving, etc. According to Dr. Carola Surkamp, professor at University of Cologne, non-verbal phatic communication can be expressed with involuntary physical features such as direction of gaze, blushing, posture, etc. and that these have a vital function in regulating conversation.

== Online phatic expressions ==
Phatic expressions are used on different communication platforms on the internet such as social media networks where certain platforms require and prompt certain actions to be made between users to communicate or implicate certain messages between people without direct utterances. Examples for this would be: 'likes', comments/replies, shares/reblogs, emoji use, etc. These phatic posts as Radovanovic and Ragnedda like to call them, are again used with a social function of social communicative upkeep with the primary function of expressing social connection, relationships between users, and recognition of coparticipants.

== See also ==
- Backchannel (linguistics)
- Filler (linguistics)
- High-context and low-context cultures
- Literal and figurative language
- Pragmatics (linguistics)
- Small talk
- Sociolinguistics
