= Ingressive sound =

Sound made while inhaling by the nose or mouth

Ingressive

◌↓
- IPA number: 661

Encoding
- Unicode (hex): U+2193
Image

In phonetics, ingressive sounds are sounds by which the airstream flows inward through the mouth or nose. The three types of ingressive sounds are lingual ingressive or velaric ingressive (from the tongue and the velum), glottalic ingressive (from the glottis), and pulmonic ingressive (from the lungs).

The opposite of an ingressive sound is an egressive sound, by which the air stream is created by pushing air out through the mouth or nose. The majority of sounds in most languages, such as /b/, are both pulmonic and egressive.

== Types ==
=== Lingual ===
Lingual ingressive, or velaric ingressive, describes an airstream mechanism in which a sound is produced by closing the vocal tract at two places of articulation in the mouth, then rarefying the air in the enclosed space by lowering the tongue, and then releasing either or both closures. These are the click consonants.

=== Glottalic ===
Glottal ingressive is the term generally applied to the implosive consonants, which when voiced actually use a mixed glottalic ingressive–pulmonic egressive airstream. Voiceless implosives are true glottalic ingressives.

=== Pulmonic ===
Pulmonic ingressive describes ingressive sounds in which the airstream is created by the lungs. These are nearly always paralinguistic. They may be found as phonemes, words, and entire phrases on all continents and in genetically unrelated languages, most frequently in sounds for agreement and backchanneling.

In the extensions to the International Phonetic Alphabet, the symbol ⟨↓⟩ is provided for ingressive sounds, so the Norwegian backchanneling particles ja and nei would be transcribed ⟨jɑː↓⟩ and ⟨næɪ↓⟩. A snore could be transcribed [𝼀↓ːː]. But the symbol is used even with standard IPA transcription: for example, to mark intakes of breath.

Some pulmonic ingressive sounds lack egressive counterparts. For example, the cell for a velar trill in the IPA chart is greyed out as not being possible, but an ingressive velar (or velic) trill is a snort; this has been jocularly transcribed ⟨ꙫ⟩, intended to resemble the snout of a pig.

Pulmonic ingressive sounds are extremely rare outside paralinguistics. A pulmonic ingressive phoneme was found in the ritual language Damin, as in l*i [ɬ↓ʔi] 'fish'; its last speaker died in the 1990s. ǃXóõ has a series of nasalized click consonants in which the nasal airstream is pulmonic ingressive. Ladefoged & Maddieson (1996:268) state, "This ǃXóõ click is probably unique among the sounds of the world's languages that, even in the middle of a sentence, it may have ingressive pulmonic airflow." Tsou was once said to have an ingressive phoneme, but subsequent investigation did not confirm this.

Laver uses ⟨˒⟩ instead for ⟨j˒ɑː˒⟩ and ⟨n˒æɪ˒⟩.

== Ingressive speech ==
Norwegian "Ja"
Norwegian spoken ja juxtaposed with ingressive

Ingressive speech sounds are produced while the speaker breathes in, in contrast to most speech sounds, which are produced as the speaker breathes out. The air that is used to voice the speech is drawn in rather than pushed out.

=== Occurrence ===
Speech technologist Robert Eklund has found reports of ingressive speech in around 50 languages worldwide, dating as far back as Cranz's (1765) "Historie von Grönland" which mentions it in female affirmations among the Eskimo. Despite being a common phenomenon, it is frequently associated with Scandinavian languages. Most words that are subject to ingressive speech are backchanneling words ("yes, no"). It sometimes occurs in rapid counting to maintain a steady airflow throughout a long series of unbroken sounds. In English, ingressive sounds include when one says "Huh!" (a gasping sound) to express surprise or "Sss" (an inward hiss) to express empathy when another is hurt.

Japanese has what has been described an apicoprepalatal fricative approximant. This sound is similar to an inbreathed [s↓]. It is used as a response to statements that are upsetting, or as a sign of deference. Japanese-speakers also use an ingressive bilateral bidental friction as a "pre-turn opening in conversation" or to begin a prayer.

Long strings of speech may be inhaled when the speaker is sobbing. There are claims of Tohono Oʼodham women speaking entirely ingressively.

=== Inhaled affirmative 'yeah' ===
Several languages include an affirmative "yeah", "yah", "yuh", or "yes" that is made with inhaled breath, which sounds something like a gasp. That is an example of a pulmonic ingressive and is found as follows:

- Dialects of English spoken in Ireland (Hiberno-English) and the Scottish Highlands (Highland English), typically used to express agreement and show attentiveness.
- Dialects of English spoken in Newfoundland and the Maritimes in Canada.
- Dialects of English spoken in the US state of Maine. The word is often transcribed as "ayup", and people attempting to imitate Maine accent rarely use the ingressive form. It is missing in most Maine-dialect television and Hollywood productions.
- Casual European French (ouais).
- In Faroese and Icelandic, entire phrases are sometimes produced ingressively.
- In Danish, Norwegian, and Swedish, words like "ja", "jo" (yes), "nei/nej" (no) are often pronounced with inhaled breath. The main function of inhaled speech can be paralinguistic, showing agreement with a statement and encouraging a speaker to continue, but in northern Sweden, "Yes" can be replaced with an inhalation alone. It is consequently also typical of dialogue.
- In Low German and northern German varieties of standard German, an affirmative "ja" (yes) is sometimes pronounced ingressively, especially for backchanneling.
- In Finnish joo or juu (yes).
- In Estonian "jah" (yes) or informally also "jep" (yep).
- In Khalkha Mongolian, the words тийм [tʰiːm] ("that/[yes]"), үгүй [uɡui] ("no"), and мэдэхгүй [mɛdɛx-ɡui] know.inf-neg ("[I] don't know") are often pronounced in daily conversation with pulmonic ingressive airflow.
- In Ewe and other languages of Togo, as well as in parts of Mali and Cameroon and in the Hausa language of southern Niger and northern Nigeria.
- In Philippine languages such as Tagalog [opo] and more forcefully in Waray and softer in Borongan (Samar Province) [uhuh] or [ohoh] usually spelled in these countries oo and possibly stronger in Oras, Arteche, Dolores (all in Samar). The sound is almost guttural and the aspirant is inhaled, not exhaled, air. Thus, for an English-speaker exhaling the response, the exhaled sound is not understood by native Samar-speakers. The American English trouble expression "uh-oh" does not approximate it. Eastern, Western, and Northern Samar have different accents in the same dialect.

== General sources ==
- Ladefoged, Peter; Maddieson, Ian (1996). The Sounds of the World's Languages. Oxford: Blackwell. ISBN 0-631-19815-6.
