= Jules Séglas =

French psychiatrist

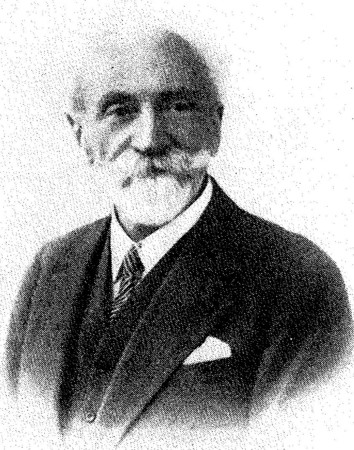
Jules Séglas

Jules Séglas (May 31, 1856 – 1939) was a French psychiatrist who practiced medicine at the Bicêtre and Salpêtrière Hospitals in Paris.

Early in his career, he was an assistant to famed neurologist Jean-Martin Charcot (1825–1893). Séglas' ideas and theories influenced a number of psychiatrists, including Henri Ey (1900–1977) and Jacques Lacan (1901–1981). In 1908 he became president of the Societé Medico-Psychologique.

In the field of psychopathology he conducted studies of delusions, hallucinations and pseudohallucinations, providing a detailed nosology of these phenomena. He did extensive research of language and its relationship to mental illness. Here, he described linguistic traits such as logorrhea, embolalia, near-mutism, automatic speech, alexia, agraphia, et al.; and how these behaviors take shape and interact in various psychiatric disorders.

== Selected writings ==
- L’hallucination dans ses rapports avec la fonction du langage, Progrès médical, 1888.
- Des Troubles du langage chez les Aliénés, Rueff Editeurs, Paris, 1892.
- Leçons cliniques sur les maladies mentales et nerveuses (Salpêtrière (1887–94), Asselin et Houzeau, Paris, 1895
- Le délire de négations, in Du délire des négations aux idées d'énormité, Jules Cotard & autres, L'Harmattan.
- Sémiologie des affections mentales (Semiology of mental disorders), Chap. IV, Book I, 74-270, in Gilbert Ballet's Traité de pathologie mentale.
