= Small talk =

Type of discourse

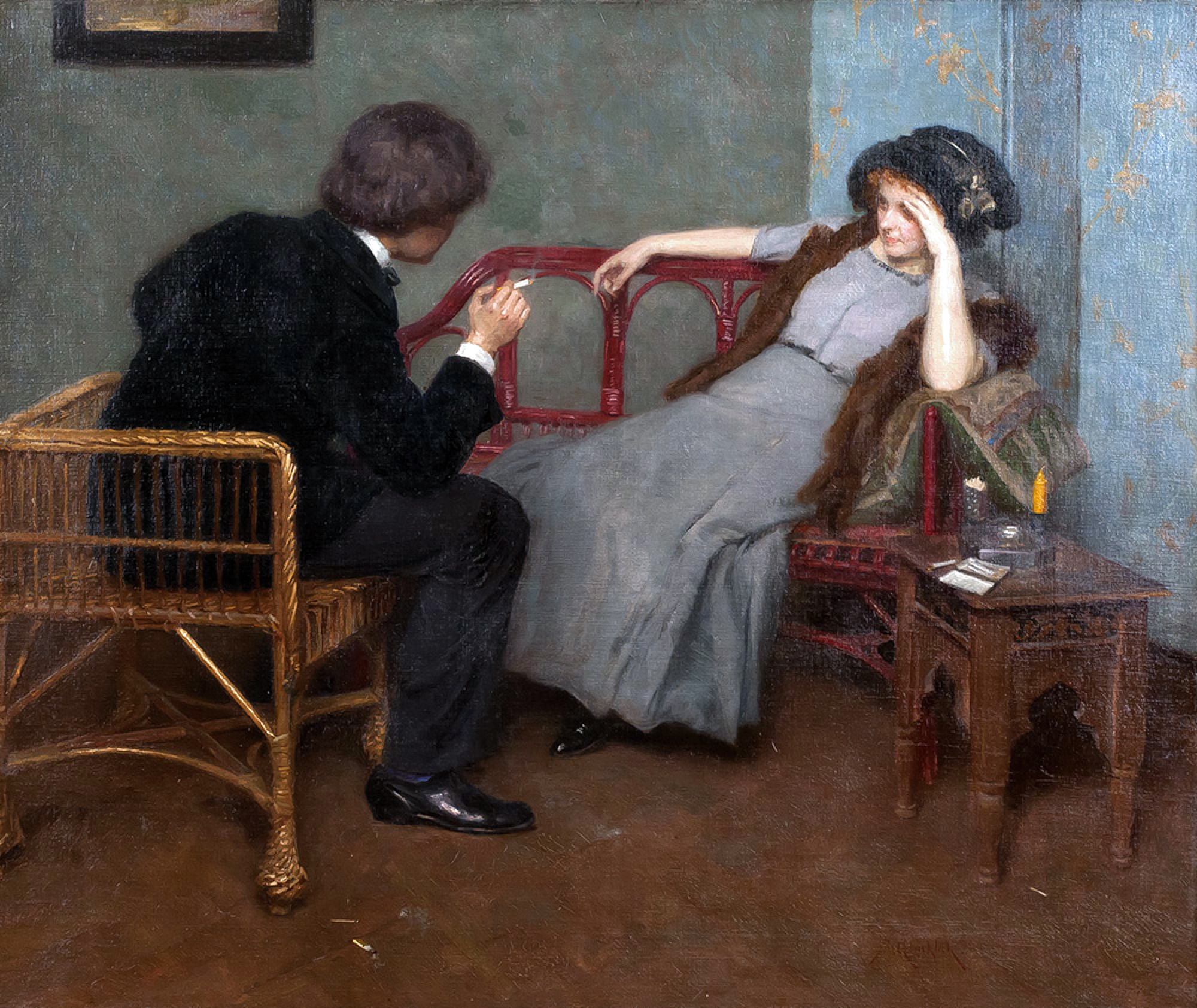
Simon Glücklich, Paar im Gespräch (Couple in Conversation), c. 1885

Small talk is an informal type of discourse that does not cover any functional topics of conversation or any transactions that need to be addressed. In essence, it is polite and standard conversation about unimportant things.

Small talk consists of three main parts: a greeting, conversation, and a closing. Small talk is vital in maintaining social cohesion. The topics used in small talk are important to create a social environment that feels neutral and safe.

The phenomenon of small talk was initially studied in 1923 by Bronisław Malinowski in his essay "The Problem of Meaning in Primitive Languages", who coined the term "phatic communication" to describe it. Phatic communication, or small talk, is not used to exchange important information; instead it is used to build and maintain interpersonal relationships. The ability to conduct small talk is a social skill.

There are differences in small talk between genders. Women use compliments as a form of friendly phatic communion, while men use joking as a way of connecting through small talk. There are differences and similarities between cultural small talk. While some cultures use small talk similarly to English culture, others use it differently.

== Purpose ==
Small talk is a bonding ritual and a strategy for managing interpersonal distance. It serves many functions in helping to define the relationships between friends, colleagues, and new acquaintances. In particular, it helps new acquaintances to explore and categorize each other's social position.

Small talk is closely related to the need for people to maintain a positive face and feel approved of by those who are listening to them. It lubricates social interactions in a very flexible way, but the desired function is often dependent on the point in the conversation at which the small talk occurs:

Small talk can be used as a conversation opener: When the speakers do not know each other, it allows them to show that they have friendly intentions and desire some sort of positive interaction. In a business meeting, it enables people to establish each other's reputation and level of expertise. If there is already a relationship between the two talkers, their small talk serves as a gentle introduction before engaging in more functional topics of conversation. It allows them to signal their own mood and to sense the mood of the other person.

Small talk may take place at the end of a conversation: Suddenly ending an exchange may risk appearing to reject the other person. Small talk can be used to mitigate that rejection, affirm the relationship between the two people, and soften the parting.

Small talk can fill space to avoid silence: In many cultures, silences between two people are usually considered uncomfortable and/or awkward. Tension can be reduced by starting phatic talk until a more substantial subject arises. Generally, humans find prolonged silence uncomfortable, and sometimes unbearable. That can be due to human evolutionary history as a social species, as in many other social animals, silence is a communicative sign of potential danger.

The need to use small talk depends upon the nature of the relationship between the people having the conversation. Couples in an intimate relationship can signal their level of closeness by a lack of small talk. They can comfortably accept silence in circumstances that would be uncomfortable for two people who were only casual friends.

In workplace situations, small talk tends to occur mostly between workers on the same level, but it can be used by managers as a way of developing the working relationships with the staff who report to them. Bosses who ask their employees to work overtime may try to motivate them by using small talk to temporarily decrease their difference in status.

The balance between functional conversation and small talk in the workplace depends on the context and is also influenced by the relative power of the two speakers. It is usually the superior who defines the conversation because they have the power to close the small talk and "get down to business."

== Topics ==
The topics of small talk conversations are generally less important than their social function. The selected topic usually depends on any pre-existing relationship between the two people, and the circumstances of the conversation. In either case, someone initiating small talk will tend to choose a topic for which they can assume a shared background knowledge, to prevent the conversation from being too one-sided.

Topics can be summarised as being either direct or indirect. Direct topics include personal observations such as health or looks. Indirect topics refer to a situational context such as the latest news, or the conditions of the communicative situation. Some topics are considered to be "safe" in most circumstances, such as the weather, sports, and television. Asking about the weather when the weather lacks reason for a follow-up discussion may stall a conversation.

When people are asked, "How are you?" they normally would not give a detailed description of how they are doing. Instead they would use a generic response that keeps the social climate positive and appropriate.

== Conversational patterns ==
A study of small talk in situations that involve the chance meeting of strangers has been carried out by Klaus Schneider. He theorizes that such a conversation consists of a number of fairly predictable segments, or "moves". The first move is usually phrased so that it is easy for the other person to agree. It may be either a question or a statement of opinion with a tag question. For example, an opening line such as "Lovely weather, isn't it?" is a clear invitation for agreement. The second move is the other person's response. In functional conversations that address a particular topic, Grice's maxim of quantity suggests that responses should contain no more information than was explicitly asked for. Schneider claims that one of the principles of small talk contradicts the maxim of quantity. He suggests that politeness in small talk is maximized by responding with a more substantial answer. Going back to the example of "Lovely weather, isn't it?", to respond factually by just saying "Yes" (or even "No") is less polite than saying, "Yes, very mild for the time of year". Schneider describes that subsequent moves may involve an acknowledgement such as "I see", a positive evaluation such as "That's nice", or what's called "idling behavior", a non engaging response such as "Mmm", or "Really?".

== Gender and cultural differences ==
Speech patterns between women tend to be more collaborative than those of men, and tend to support each other's involvement in the conversation. Topics for small talk are more likely to include compliments about some aspect of personal appearance. For example, "That dress really suits you." By contrast, men's small talk includes more joking and friendly banter. Men also connect through small talk by talking about work, activities or shared interests.

Small talk rules and topics can differ widely between cultures. Weather is a common topic in regions where the climate has great variation and can be unpredictable. For example, researchers found that in the Chinese culture, small talk often consisted of the bad weather. In contrast to the English culture's use of small talk, the Chinese culture uses a wider range of small talk topics.

Questions about the family are usual in some Asian and Arab countries. In cultures or contexts that are status-oriented, such as China, Latin America and Japan, small talk between new acquaintances may feature exchange of questions that enable social categorization of each other.

Researchers found that in the Spanish culture, small talk is comparatively similar to that of English culture small talk. In the Spanish culture they also use a similar pattern of greetings, conversation, and closing of the conversation.

Differences among members of various cultural groups in aspects of their attitudes to small talk and ways of dealing with small talk situations are considered to be rooted in their socioculturally ingrained perception of interpersonal relationships. In many European cultures it is common to discuss the weather, politics or the economy, although in some countries personal finance issues such as salary are considered taboo.

Finland and Sweden have been cited as countries where there is little culture of small talk and people are more comfortable with silence. In contrast, Southern Europeans, for example, are said to use a lot of words to convey very little information.

== See also ==
- Active listening
- Cheap talk (game theory)
- Contact call
- Social lubricant
- Sociolinguistics
- Transactional analysis
- Phatic expression
- Tritsch-Tratsch-Polka by Johann Strauss II, from the German for "chit-chat"
