= So (word) =

English word

So is an English word that, apart from its other uses, has become increasingly popular in recent years as a coordinating conjunctive opening word in a sentence. This device is particularly used when answering questions although the questioner may also use the device. So may also be used to end sentences. When ending a sentence, it may be:

- a coordinating conjunctive to refer backwards to something previously mentioned
- a coordinating conjunctive dangling "so" (sometimes called trailing "so") to refer forwards to something that may be said
- an intensifying adverb.

== Sentence opener ==
The first known written use of so as a sentence opener is in several lines of Chaucer's Troilus and Criseyde, published in the mid-1380s, for example:

So graunte hem sone out of this world to pace (So grant him soon out of this world to pass);

So as a sentence opener has been used in later historical literary works such as:

- The Rape of Lucrece, 1594, by William Shakespeare
- Pamela: or, Virtue Rewarded, 1740, by Samuel Richardson

It is widely believed that the recent ascendancy of so as a sentence opener began in Silicon Valley. Michael Lewis, in his book The New New Thing, published in 1999, noted that "When a computer programmer answers a question, he often begins with the word 'so.'" Microsoft employees have long argued that the "so" boom began with them.

=== Purpose ===
Various suggestions have been made as to its purpose:

- as a coordinating conjunctive to refer backwards to something previously mentioned
- as a discourse marker
- to signal that the following words are chosen for their relevance to the listener
- to provide a small amount of extra thinking time

In his Modern English translation of Beowulf, Irish poet Seamus Heaney uses "So" to translate the single-word opening line, Hwæt! (also rendered 'lo', 'hark', 'listen', etc). He explains that "in Hiberno-English Scullion-speak [...] 'so' operates as an expression that obliterates all previous discourse and narrative, and at the same time functions as an exclamation calling for immediate attention. So, 'so' it was".

== Sentence closer ==
=== Referring back ===
"So" may refer back to something previously mentioned, such as:

- "If she notices, she never says so."
- Speaker 1: "Has somebody called an ambulance?" Speaker 2: "I believe so."

Other possibilities include:

- "Absolutely so."
- "How so?"
- "I am afraid so."
- "Indeed so."
- "It is not so."
- "It is so."
- "Is it so?"
- "Is that so?"
- "...just so."
- "...less so."
- "Let it be so."
- "...like so."
- "...made it so."
- "...make it so."
- "...more so."
- "Not so."
- "...or so."
- "Quite so."
- "So?"
- "...so-and-so."
- "Why so?"

=== Dangling so ===
A dangling "so" in conversation invites the listener to articulate or consider the implications of the information provided without the speaker having to articulate it himself or herself. It has been interpreted as sometimes a form of bragging. A dangling "so" in conversation may be represented in text as "so" followed by an ellipsis: "...". Examples of dangling "so":

- "Yeah, it's pretty exciting, though we're not really sure whether it will work out, so..."
- Speaker 1: "How was your date?" Speaker 2: "Well, he didn't show up, so..."

== Intensifying adverb ==
"So" may close a sentence as an intensifying adverb, such as in "I love her so". "So" in the middle of a sentence can also be an intensifying adverb, such as in "I so love her".

== See also ==
- Discourse marker
- Filler (linguistics)
