= Filler (linguistics) =

Words or sounds used without meaning, like "umm" or "Err.."

In linguistics, a filler, filled pause, hesitation marker or planner is a sound or word that participants in a conversation use to signal that they are pausing to think but are not finished speaking. These are not to be confused with placeholder names, such as thingamajig. Fillers fall into the category of formulaic language, and different languages have different characteristic filler sounds. The term filler also has a separate use in the syntactic description of wh-movement constructions (see below).

== Usage ==
Every conversation involves turn-taking, and speakers need to signal whether they are yielding the turn or want to keep going. Pauses are common in both cases, but to avoid confusion, speakers wanting to continue commonly use fillers, such as um, er, or uh.

Beyond conveying "I still want to talk", fillers can also convey more: whether the speaker is just trying to find the right word or is struggling to formulate his/her thought at a deeper level. "Uh" is more common in the former, and "um" in the latter. However fillers are often more complex, conveying many nuances of meaning and doing so through subtle variation, both prosodic and phonetic, such that many fillers are sound combinations, rather than words.

Filled pauses can affect listeners' processing of upcoming speech; one study found that hearing an "uh" improved recognition of upcoming words, while "um" had neither a beneficial nor detrimental effect.The actual words that people use may change (such as the increasing use of like), but the meaning and the reasons for using them do not change.

== In English ==
In American English, the most common filler sounds are uh /ʌ/, ah /ɑː/, and um /ʌm/. In British English, the equivalents are er /ɜː/ and erm /ɜːm/. Among younger speakers, the fillers "like", "you know", "I mean", "okay", "so", "actually", "basically", and "right?" are among the more prevalent.

== In other languages ==
- In Afrikaans, ah, um, and uh are common fillers (um, and uh being in common with English).
- In American Sign Language, UM can be signed with open-8 held at chin, palm in, eyebrows down (similar to FAVORITE); or bilateral symmetric bent-V, palm out, repeated axial rotation of wrist (similar to QUOTE).
- In Arabic, يعني yaʿni ("means") and وﷲ wallāh(i) ("by God") are common fillers. In Moroccan Arabic, زعمة z3ma ("like") is a common filler, as well as ewa (so). In Iraqi Arabic, shisma ("what's its name") is a filler.
- In Armenian, բան ban ("thing"), Միգուցե Miguts'e, ("maybe"), էլի ēli ("c'mon") and ոնց որ vonts' vor ("as if") are common fillers.*
- In Asturian, some common fillers are bono (well..), ¿acuéi? (right?), eh, ho (shortening of home "man"), (y) hala/hale ([and] come on), pos (thus), asina que (so that), yá (already), nada (nothing), entós (then) and pos nada (thus, nothing).
- In Bengali, ইয়ে (yay and thuri ("..er..that is")) are common fillers.
- In Bislama, ah is the common filler.
- In Bulgarian, common fillers are ъ (uh), амии (amii, 'well'), тъй (tui, 'so'), така (taka, 'thus'), добре (dobre, 'well'), такова (takova, 'this') and значи (znachi, 'it means'), нали (nali, 'right').
- In Cantonese, speakers often say 即係 zik1 hai6 ('that is to say; meaning') and 噉 gam2 ('so; then') as fillers.
- In Catalan, eh? /ɛ/, doncs ("so"), llavors ("therefore"), o sigui ("it means"), saps? ("you know"?) and diguem-ne ("say") are common fillers.
- In Croatian, the words ovaj (literally "this one", but the meaning is lost) and dakle ("so"), and znači ("meaning", "it means") are frequent.
- In Czech, fillers are called slovní vata, meaning "word cotton/padding", or parasitické výrazy, meaning "parasitic expressions". The most frequent fillers are čili, tak or takže ("so"), prostě ("simply"), jako ("like").
- In Danish, øh and øhm are among the most common fillers.
- In Dhivehi, aney, mee, ehkala, dhen and alhey ("aww") are some common fillers.
- In Dutch, ehm and dus ("thus") are some of the more common fillers. Other common fillers are eigenlijk ("actually"), zo ("so"), zeg maar ("so to say"), nou ("well") in Netherlandic Dutch, allez ("come on") and (a)wel ("well") in Belgian Dutch, weet je? ("you know?") etc.
- In Esperanto, nu ("well") and do ("so") are the most common fillers.
- In Estonian, nii ("so") is one of the most common fillers.
- In Filipino, ah, eh, ay, and ano ("what"), parang ("like"), diba? ("isn't it right?"), ayun ("that's") are the most common fillers.
- In Finnish, niinku ("like"), tuota, and öö are the most common fillers. Swearing is also used as a filler often, especially among youth. The most common swear word for that is vittu, which is a word for female genitalia.
- In Metropolitan French, euh /ø/ is most common; other words used as fillers include quoi ("what"), bah, ben ("well"), tu vois ("you see"), t'vois c'que j'veux dire? ("you see what I mean?"), tu sais, t'sais ("you know"), eh bien (roughly "well", as in "Well, I'm not sure"), and du coup (roughly "suddenly"). Outside France other expressions are t'sais veux dire? ("y'know what I mean?"; Québec), or allez une fois ("go one time"; especially in Brussels, not in Wallonia). Additional filler words used by youngsters include genre ("kinda", "like"), comme ("like"), and style ("style"; "kind").
- In German, traditional filler words include äh /ɛː/, hm, so /zoː/, tja, halt, and eigentlich ("actually"). So-called modal particles share some of the features of filler words, but they actually modify the sentence meaning.
- In Greek, ε (e), εμ (em), λοιπόν (lipon, "so") and καλά (kala, "good") are common fillers.
- In Hebrew, אֶה (eh) is the most common filler. אֶם (em) is also quite common. Millennials and the younger Generation X speakers commonly use כאילו (ke'ilu, the Hebrew version of "like"). Additional filler words include זתומרת (zt'omeret, short for זאת אומרת zot omeret "that means"), אז (az, "so") and בקיצור (bekitsur, "in short"). Use of fillers of Arabic origin such as יענו (yaʿanu, a mispronunciation of the Arabic يعني, yaʿani) is also common.
- In Hindi, मतलब (matlab, "it means"), क्या कहते हैं (kya kehte hain, "what do you say"), वो ना (woh na, "that") and ऐसा है। (aisā hai, "what it is") are some word fillers. Sound fillers include हूँ (hoon, [ɦuːm̩]), अ (a, [ə]),आ (aa, [äː]).
- In Hungarian, filler sound is ő, common filler words include hát, nos (well...) and asszongya (a variant of azt mondja, which means "it says here..."). Among intellectuals, ha úgy tetszik (if you like) is used as filler.
- In Icelandic, a common filler is hérna ("here"). Þúst, a contraction of þú veist ("you know"), is popular among younger speakers.
- In Indonesian, anu and apa sih are among the most common fillers.
- In Irish, abair /ˈabˠəɾʲ/ ("say"), bhoil /wɛlʲ/ ("well"), and era /ˈɛɾˠə/ are common fillers, along with emm as in Hiberno-English.
- In Italian, common fillers include ehm ("um", "uh"), allora ("well then", "so"), tipo ("like"), ecco ("there"), cioè ("actually", "that is to say", "rather"), and be' ("well", "so"; most likely a shortening of bene or ebbene, which are themselves often used as filler words).
- In Japanese, common fillers include ええと (ēto, or "um"), あの (ano, literally "that over there", used as "um"), ま (ma, or "well"), そう (sō, used as "hmmm"), and ええ (ē, used as "huh" as a response of surprise or confusion).
- In Kannada, matte for "also", enappa andre for "the matter is" are common fillers.
- In Kashmiri, یہِ ہَے یہِ yi hay yi ("that oh that") is used as a filler.
- In Korean, 응 (eung), 어 (eo), 그 (geu), and 음 (eum) are commonly used as fillers.
- In Kurdish, icar ("so, then") (ئینجا (inca in Sorani and Palewani, mostly pronounced as "ija"), as well as baš e ("well") (or خاس ە (xas e)) are common filler words. In Badinani, mn got ("I said") and ez d bêjm ("I say") (mostly shortened to "m'go'" and "e'd bê'm") are used similarly to "I mean". ueki ("like, such as") (وەکو (ueku) in others) is used similarly to "like".
- In Kyrgyz, анан (anan, "then", "so"), баягы (bayağı, "that"), жанагы (janağı, "that"), ушуреки (uşureki, "this"), эме (eme, "um"), are common fillers.
- In Lithuanian, nu, am, žinai ("you know"), ta prasme ("meaning"), tipo ("like") are some common fillers.
- In Malay, speakers often use words and phrases such as apa nama (literally, "what name") or itu ("that") as common fillers.
- In Malayalam, അതായതു (athayathu, "that means...") and ennu vechaal ("then...") are common.
- In Maltese and Maltese English, mela ("then"), or just la, is a common filler.
- In Mandarin Chinese, speakers often say 那個; 那个 (pronounced nàge/nèige), meaning 'that'. Other common fillers are 就; jiù; 'just' and 好像; hǎoxiàng; 'as if/kind of like'.
- In Mirandese, speakers often use pus (slang for puis, "right"), bá (interjection of multiple uses), bien ("well"), or for some speakers, bon, being a direct loan from Portuguese bom, meaning "well", but only being loaned as the filler word and not its other uses, where the native buono is maintained (regional languages of Spain also suffered through this process, with the Castilian word bueno).
- In Mongolian, одоо (odoo, "now") and нөгөө (nögöö, "that") are common fillers.
- In Nepali, माने (maane, "meaning"), चैने (chaine), चैं (chai), हैन (haina, "No?") are commonly used as fillers.
- In Norwegian, common fillers are eh, altso/altså, på ein måte / på en måte ("in a way"), berre/bare ("just") ikkje sant / ikke sant (literally "not true?", meaning "don't you agree?", "right?", "no kidding" or "exactly")l, vel ("well"), liksom ("like") and er det ("is it", "it is"). In Bergen, sant ("true") is often used instead of ikkje/ikke sant. In the region of Trøndelag, /ʃø/ (comes from skjønner du which means "you see/understand)", "as you can see/understand") is also a common filler.
- In Persian, ببین (bebin, "look"), چیز (chiz, "thing"), and مثلا (masalan, "for instance") are commonly used filler words. As well as in Arabic and Urdu, يعني (yaʿni, "I mean") is also used in Persian. Also, اه eh is a common filler in Persian.
- In Portuguese, é, hum, então ("so"), tipo ("like") and bem ("well") are the most common fillers.
- In Polish, the most common filler sound is yyy /ɨ/ and also eee /ɛ/ (both like English um) and while common, its use is frowned upon. Other examples include, no /nɔ/ (like English well), wiesz /vjeʂ/ ("you know"). Among the younger generation new, often english-inspired, fillers are gaining popularity: generalnie/ogólnie ("generally"), jakby ("like"), w sensie ("in the sense that"), w sumie ("to sum it up").
- In Punjabi, مطلب (मतलब, mat̤lab, "it means") is a common filler.
- In Romanian, deci /detʃʲ/ ("therefore") is common, especially in school, and ă /ə/ is also very common (can be lengthened according to the pause in speech, rendered in writing as ăăă), whereas păi /pəj/ is widely used by almost anyone. A modern filler has gained popularity among the youths – gen /dʒɛn/, analogous to the English "like", literally translated as "type".
- In Russian, fillers are called слова-паразиты (slova-parazity, "parasite words"); the most common are э-э (è-è, "eh"), вот (vot, "here it is"), это (èto, "this"), того (togo, "that kind, sort of"), (ну) такое ((nu) takoye, "some kind [of this]"), ну (nu, "well, so"), значит (značit, "I mean, kind of, like"), так (tak, "so"), как его (kak ego, "what's it [called]"), типа (tipa, "kinda"), как бы (kak by, "[just] like, sort of"), and понимаешь? (ponimayesh, "understand?, you know, you see").
- In Serbian, значи (znači, "means"), па (pa, "so"), мислим (mislim, "i think") and овај (ovaj, "this") are common fillers.
- In Slovak, oné ("that"), tento ("this"), proste ("simply"), or akože ("it's like...") are used as fillers. The Hungarian izé (or izí in its Slovak pronunciation) can also be heard, especially in parts of the country with a large Hungarian population. Ta is a filler typical of Eastern Slovak and one of the most parodied features.
- In Slovene, pač ("indeed", "just", "merely"), a ne? ("right?"), no ("well"), v bistvu ("in fact"), and pravzaprav ("actually") are some of the most common fillers.
- In Spanish, fillers are called muletillas. Some of the most common in American Spanish are e, em, este (roughly equivalent to uhm, literally means "this"), and o sea (roughly equivalent to "I mean", literally means "or be it"). In Spain the previous fillers are also used, but ¿Vale? ("right?") and ¿no? are very common too and pues ("well") is also used. Younger speakers there often use en plan (meaning "as", "like" or "in [noun] mode"). The Argentine filler word che became the nickname of rebel Ernesto "Che" Guevara, by virtue of his frequent use of it. Other possible filled pauses in Spanish are: a, am, bueno, como, and others.
- In Swedish, fillers are called utfyllnadsord; some of the most common are öhm or öh, ja ("yes"), ehm or eh (for example eh jag vet inte) or ba (comes from bara, which means "only"), asså or alltså ("therefore", "thus"), va (comes from vad, which means "what"), and liksom and typ (both similar to the English "like").
- In Tamil, paatheenga-na ("if you see...") and apparam ("then...") are common.
- In Telugu, ఇక్కడ ఏంటంటే (ikkada entante, "what's here is...") and తర్వాత (tarwatha, "then...") are common and there are numerous like this.
- In Turkish, yani ("meaning..."), şey ("thing"), işte ("that is"), and falan ("as such", "so on") are common fillers.
- In Ukrainian, е (e, similar to "um"), ну (nu, "well"), і (i, "and"), цей (tsey, "this"), той-во (toy-vo, "this one") are common fillers.
- In Urdu, یعنی (yani, "meaning..."), فلانا فلانا (flana flana, "this and that" or "blah blah"), ہاں ہاں (haan haan, "yeah yeah") and اچھا (acha, "ok") are also common fillers.
- In Vietnamese (Tiếng Việt), "ơ" or "à" (surprise); "ý là" (I mean); ...
- In Welsh (Cymraeg), 'dê or yndê, from onid e – 'Is it not so?' – is used as a filler, and in a similar way, especially in southern dialects t'mod and ch'mod (abbreviations of rwyt ti'n gwybod and rydych chi'n gwybod – the singular and plural/respectful forms of 'you know') along with t'wel(d) and ch'wel(d) (abbreviations of rwyt ti'n gweld and rydych chi'n gweld – 'you see'); 'lly (from felly – 'so/such/like/in that way', used in northern dialects); iawn ('alright/right') is used as a filler at the beginning, middle or end of sentences; Welsh: o'r gorau, lit. 'of the best' – used loosely to mean 'alright'; 'na ni, an abbreviation of dyna ni – 'there we are'; ym… and y… are used similarly to the English 'um…' and 'uh…'.

== In syntax ==
The linguistic term "filler" has another, unrelated use in syntactic terminology. It refers to the pre-posed element that fills in the "gap" in a wh-movement construction. Wh-movement is said to create a long-distance or unbounded "filler-gap dependency". In the following example, there is an object gap associated with the transitive verb saw, and the filler is the wh-phrase how many angels: "I don't care [how many angels] she told you she saw."

== See also ==
- Aizuchi
- Interjection
- Like: as a discourse particle
- Phatic expression
- So (word)
- Speech disfluency
