= False etymology =

Popular, but false belief about word origins

A false etymology, also known as paretymology, is an incorrect theory about the origin or derivation of a specific word or phrase. When a false etymology becomes a popular belief in a cultural or linguistic community, it is a folk etymology (or popular etymology). (Note: Folk etymology may also refer to the process by which a word or phrase is changed because of a popular false etymology.)

Such etymologies often have the feel of urban legends and can be more colorful and fanciful than the typical etymologies found in dictionaries, often involving stories of unusual practices in particular subcultures (e.g. Oxford students from non-noble families being supposedly forced to write sine nobilitate by their name, soon abbreviated to s.nob., hence the word snob).

== Definitions ==
To disambiguate the usage of the term "folk/popular etymology", linguist Ghil'ad Zuckermann proposes a clear-cut distinction between the derivational-only popular etymology (DOPE) and the generative popular etymology (GPE): the DOPE refers to a popular false etymology involving no neologization, and the GPE refers to neologization generated by a popular false etymology.

== Source and influence ==
Erroneous etymologies can exist for many reasons. Some are reasonable interpretations of the evidence that happen to be false. For a given word there may often have been many serious attempts by scholars to propose etymologies based on the best information available at the time, and these can be later modified or rejected as linguistic scholarship advances. The results of medieval etymology, for example, were plausible given the insights available at the time, but have often been rejected by modern linguists. The etymologies of humanist scholars in the early modern period began to produce more reliable results, but many of their hypotheses have also been superseded.

Other false etymologies are the result of specious and untrustworthy claims made by individuals, such as the unfounded claims made by Daniel Cassidy that hundreds of common English words such as baloney, grumble, and bunkum derive from the Irish language.

In the United States, some of these scandalous legends have had to do with racism and slavery; common words such as picnic, buck, and crowbar have been alleged to stem from derogatory terms or racist practices.

== See also ==
- List of common false etymologies of English words
- Back-formation
- Backronym
- Bongo-Bongo (linguistics)
- Chinese word for "crisis"
- Eggcorn
- Etymological fallacy
- Etymology
- False cognate
- False friend
- Just-so story
- Linguistic interference
- List of proposed etymologies of OK
- Phonestheme
- Phono-semantic matching
- Pseudoscientific language comparison
- Semantic change
