= David F. Larcker =

American academic

- Education: University of Kansas; University of Missouri-Rolla
- Occupations: professor, author
- Board member of: Trustee, Wells Fargo Advantage Funds
- Website: http://www.gsb.stanford.edu/faculty-research/faculty/david-f-larcker

David F. Larcker is an American academic and author. He is the James Irvin Miller Professor of Accounting, and director of the Corporate Governance Research Initiative at the Stanford Graduate School of Business, senior faculty of The Arthur and Toni Rembi Rock Center for Corporate Governance at Stanford University, codirector of the Stanford Directors' Consortium Executive Program and Professor of Law (by courtesy), of Stanford Law School. He also serves as a trustee of the Wells Fargo Advantage Funds.

== Biography ==
Larcker was previously the Ernst & Young Professor of Accounting at the Wharton School of the University of Pennsylvania and Professor of Accounting and Information Systems at the Kellogg Graduate School of Management at Northwestern University. He received his PhD in Business from the University of Kansas and his B.S. and M.S. in Engineering from the University of Missouri-Rolla.

Larcker's research focuses on executive compensation, corporate governance, and managerial accounting. His work examines the choice of performance measures and compensation contracts in organizations. He has current research projects on the valuation implications of corporate governance, the role of the business press in the debate on executive compensation, and modeling the cost of executive stock options. He has published numerous research studies and articles on these topics and co-authored two books with Brian Tayan, Stanford MBA 2003, titled "Corporate Governance Matters: A Closer Look at Organizational Choices and Their Consequences" published by FT Press and "A Real Look at Real World Corporate Governance".

He received the Notable Contribution to Management Accounting Literature Award in 2001 with Christopher D. Ittner for "Are Non-financial Measures Leading Indicators of Financial Performance? An Analysis of customer Satisfaction" Journal of Accounting Research (Supplement), 1–46, 1998.

== Academic Appointments ==
- At Stanford University since 2005
- Ernst & Young Professor of Accounting, The Wharton School, University of Pennsylvania, 1985–2005
- Assistant Professor - Professor, J.L. Kellogg Graduate School of Management, Northwestern University, 1978–1985

== Books ==
- Corporate Governance Matters: A Closer Look at Organizational Choices and Their Consequences
- A Real Look at Real World Corporate Governance

== Honors and awards ==
- 2012 Academic honoree, NACD Directorship 100 Forum
- 2012 Judge for the Corporate Secretary Corporate Governance Awards
- 2010 Distinguished Service Award from Stanford GSB PhD Students

== Editorial Review Boards ==
- The Accounting Review 1979–1983, 1990–1994, 2008–2010
- Journal of Accounting and Economics, 1985–present
- Journal of Accounting Research, 1987–present
- Journal of Management Accounting Research, 1988–2001
- Administrative Science Quarterly, 1994–1997
- Accounting, Organizations and Society, 1996–present
- Journal of Accounting and Public Policy, 2002–present
- Journal of Applied Corporate Finance, Advisory Board, 2004–present

== Research Interests ==
Executive Compensation, Corporate Governance, Managerial Accounting and Applied Econometrics

== Teaching Interests ==
Corporate Governance, Financial Statement Analysis, and Managerial Accounting
