= Conversation opener =

Introduction used to begin a conversation

A conversation opener is an introduction used to begin a conversation. They are frequently the subject of guides and seminars on how to make friends and/or meet people. Different situations may call for different openers (e.g. approaching a stranger on the street versus meeting them at a more structured gathering of people with like interests).

An opener often takes the form of an open-ended question, which can lead to further comments or conversation as well as creating topics for future conversations (e.g. "How's your mandrill doing?").

A closed-ended question (e.g. "Nice weather today, isn't it?") is regarded as potentially less effective because it can be answered with a simple "Mm-hmm," which is essentially a conversational dead end, requiring the initiator of the conversation to start from scratch.

How to Start a Conversation notes that in conversation openers, "There really are only two topics to choose from – The situation [or] the other person. Secondly, there are only two ways to begin a conversation: State a fact [or] ask a question/opinion". Accordingly, openers are often linked to props, e.g. "Do you have a cigarette?" "Wow, you're reading Crime and Punishment, that's one of my favorite books..." "I like your skirt, where did you get it?" etc. Many venues, such as singles tennis events, etc. are geared toward prop-based conversation openers. Some people keep conversation pieces for this purpose.

Judy Ringer's We Have to Talk: A Step-By-Step Checklist for Difficult Conversations points out that an entirely different set of openers may be used for sensitive conversations, e.g. about employee performance, in which a main goal may be to avoid putting the person on the defensive. These openers often take the form of simple direct statements such as "I have something I’d like to discuss with you that I think will help us work together more effectively".

== Conversation openers in sales settings ==
In sales settings, conversation openers often are used to probe the subject for information. Topic chosen are on 'safe ground' like 'the weather' or 'how was your journey to get here'. This information can then be used in attempts to counter objections.

This type of conversation opener is often referred to as small talk and is used to make both people in a conversation feel comfortable. Some examples of conversation openers are open-ended questions, problem-discovery questions, and value-discovery questions.

An open-ended question requires the person you are trying to engage with to answer with more than a yes or no.

A problem-discovery question gets to the prospects needs and shows interest in solving them.

A value-discovery question figures out the prospects priorities, what they value, their goals and objectives.
