= Interjection =

Word or expression used to express an emotion or sentiment

An interjection is a word or expression that occurs as an utterance on its own and expresses a spontaneous feeling, situation or reaction. It is a diverse category, with many different types, such as exclamations (ouch!, wow!), curses (damn!), greetings (hey, bye), response particles (okay, oh!, m-hm, huh?), hesitation markers (uh, er, um), and other words (stop, cool). Due to its diverse nature, the category of interjections partly overlaps with a few other categories like profanities, discourse markers, and fillers. The use and linguistic discussion of interjections can be traced historically through the Greek and Latin Modistae over many centuries.

== Historical classification ==
Greek and Latin intellectuals as well as the Modistae have contributed to the different perspectives of interjections in language throughout history. The Greeks held that interjections fell into the grammatical category of adverbs. They thought interjections modified the verb much in the same way as adverbs do, thus interjections were closely connected to verbs.

Unlike their Greek counterparts, many Latin scholars took the position that interjections did not rely on verbs and were used to communicate emotions and abstract ideas. They considered interjections to be their own independent part of speech. Further, the Latin grammarians classified any small non-word utterances as interjections.

Several hundred years later, the 13th- and 14th-century Modistae took inconsistent approaches to interjections. Some, such as Thomas of Erfurt, agreed with the former Greeks that the interjection was closely tied to the verb while others like Siger of Courtrai held that the interjection was its own part of speech syntactically, much like the Latin scholars.

== Meaning and use ==
In contrast to typical words and sentences, the function of most interjections is related to an expression of feeling, rather than representing some idea or concept. Generally, interjections can be classified into three types of meaning: volitive, emotive, or cognitive.

- Volitive interjections function as imperative or directive expressions; requesting or demanding something from the addressee (e.g., Shh! = "Be quiet!"; Boo! as in "Boo!" she cried, jumping to frighten him).
- Emotive interjections are used to express emotions, such as disgust and fear (e.g., Yuck! expressing disgust; Boo! signalling contempt as in Boo! Shame on you or by audience members or spectators after a performance).
- Cognitive interjections express thoughts which are more related to cognition, or information known to the speaker of the utterance (e.g., Um! indicating confusion or thinking).

While there exists some apparent overlap between emotive and cognitive interjections, as both express a feeling, cognitive interjections can be seen as more related to knowledge of something (i.e., information previously known to the speaker, or recently learned).

== Distinctions and modern classification ==
=== Primary and secondary interjections ===
Interjections may be subdivided and classified in several ways. A common distinction is based on relations to other word categories: primary interjections are interjections first and foremost (examples: Oops!, Ouch!, Huh?), while secondary interjections are words from other categories that have come to be used as interjections by virtue of their original meaning (examples: Damn!, Hell!) Primary interjections are generally considered to be single words (Oh!, Wow!). Secondary interjections can consist of multi-word phrases, or interjectional phrases, (examples: sup! from What's up?, Excuse me!, Oh dear!, Thank God!), but can also include single-word alarm words (Help!), swear and taboo words (Heavens!), and other words used to show emotion (Drats!). Although secondary interjections tend to interact more with the words around them, a characteristic of all interjections—whether primary or secondary—is that they can stand alone. For example, one can utter an interjection like ouch! or bloody hell! on its own, whereas a different part of speech that may seem similar in function and length, such as the conjunction the, cannot be uttered alone (one cannot just say the! independently in English).

Further distinctions can be made based on function. Exclamations and curses are primarily about giving expression to feelings or emotions, while response particles and hesitation markers are primarily directed at managing the flow of social interaction.

=== Interjections and other word classes ===
Interjections are sometimes classified as particles, a catch-all category that includes adverbs and onomatopoeia. The main thing these word types share is that they can occur on their own and do not easily undergo inflection, but they are otherwise divergent in several ways. A key difference between interjections and onomatopoeia is that interjections are typically responses to events, while onomatopoeia can be seen as imitations of events.

Interjections can also be confused with adverbs when they appear following a form of the verb "go" (as in "he went 'ouch!'"), which may seem to describe a manner of going (compare: 'he went rapidly'). However, this is only a superficial similarity, as the verb go in the first example does not describe the action of going somewhere. One way to differentiate between an interjection and adverb in this position is to find the speaker of the item in question. If it is understood that the subject of the utterance also utters the item (as in "ouch!" in the first example), then it cannot be an adverb.

Routines are considered as a form of speech acts that rely on an understood social communicative pattern between the addressee and addressed. This differs from an interjection that is more of a strategic utterance within a speech act that brings attention to the utterance but may or may not also have an intended addressed (directed at an individual or group). In addition, routines generally are multi-word expressions whereas interjections tend to be single utterances.

Under a different use of the term 'particle', particles and interjections can be distinctions in that particles cannot be independent utterances and are fully a part of the syntax of the utterance. Interjections, on the other hand, can stand alone and also are always preceded by a pause, separating them from the grammar and syntax of other surrounding utterances.

== Interjections as deictics ==
Interjections are bound by context, meaning that their interpretation is largely dependent on the time and place at which they are uttered. In linguistics, interjections can also be considered a form of deixis. Although their meaning is fixed (e.g., "Wow!" = surprised), there is also a referencing element which is tied to the situation. For example, the use of the interjection "Wow!" necessarily references some relation between the speaker and something that has just caused surprise to the speaker at the moment of the utterance. Without context, the listener would not know the referent of the expression (viz., the source of the surprise). Similarly, the interjection "Ouch!" generally expresses pain, but also requires contextual information for the listener to determine the referent of the expression (viz., the cause of the pain).

Deictic or indexical elements are also common in imperative interjections; volitive interjections such as "Ahem", "Psst!", and "Shh!" could be considered imperative, as the speaker is requesting or demanding something from the listener. Similar to the deictic pronoun "you", the referent of these expressions changes, dependent on the context of the utterance.

== Interjections across languages ==
Interjections can take very different forms and meanings across cultures. For instance, the English interjection gee has no direct equivalent in Polish, and the closest equivalent for Polish 'fu' (an interjection of disgust) is the different sounding 'Yuck!'. Curses likewise are famously language-specific and colourful. On the other hand, interjections that manage social interaction may be more similar across languages. For instance, the word 'Huh?', used when one has not caught what someone just said, is remarkably similar in 31 spoken languages around the world, prompting claims that it may be a universal word. Similar observations have been made for the interjections 'Oh!' (meaning, roughly, "now I see") and 'Mm/m-hm' (with the meaning "keep talking, I'm with you").

Across languages, interjections often use special sounds and syllable types that are not commonly used in other parts of the vocabulary. For instance, interjections like 'brr' and 'shh!' are made entirely of consonants, where in virtually all languages, words have to feature at least one vowel-like element. Some, like 'tut-tut' and 'ahem', are written like normal words, but their actual production involves clicks or throat-clearing. The phonetic atypicality of some interjections is one reason they have traditionally been considered as lying outside the realm of language.

== Examples from English ==
Several English interjections contain sounds, or are sounds as opposed to words, that do not (or very rarely) exist in regular English phonological inventory. For example:

- Ahem [əʔəm], [ʔəhəm], [əɦəm], or [ʔəhəm], ("Attention!") may contain a glottal stop [ʔ] or a [ɦ] in any dialect of English; the glottal stop is common in American English, some British dialects, and in other languages, such as German.
- Gah [ɡæh], [ɡɑː] ("Gah, there's nothing to do!") ends with [h], which does not occur with regular English words.
- Psst [psːt] ("Listen closely!") is an entirely consonantal syllable, and its consonant cluster does not occur initially in regular English words.
- Shh [ʃːː] ("Quiet!") is another entirely consonantal syllable word.
- Tut-tut [ǀ.ǀ] ("Shame on you"), also spelled tsk-tsk, is made up entirely of clicks, which are an active part of regular speech in several African languages. This particular click is dental. (This also has the spelling pronunciation [tʌt tʌt].)
- Ugh [ʌx] ("Disgusting!") ends with a velar fricative consonant, which is otherwise restricted to just a few regional dialects of English, though is common in languages like Spanish, German, Gaelic, and Russian.
- Whew or phew [ɸɪu], [ɸju] ("What a relief!"), also spelled shew, may start with a bilabial fricative, a sound pronounced with a strong puff of air through the lips. This sound is a common phoneme in such languages as Suki (a language of New Guinea) and Ewe and Logba (both spoken in Ghana and Togo).
- Uh-oh [ˈʌʔoʊ], [ˈʌ̆ʔ˦oʊ˨] ("Oh, no!") contains a glottal stop.
- Yeah [jæ] ("Yes") ends with the vowel [æ], or in some dialects the short vowel [ɛ] or tensed [ɛə], none of which are found at the end of any regular English words.

== See also ==
- Aizuchi, Japanese interjections used to show understanding in conversations
- Apostrophe (figure of speech)
- Discourse marker
- Filler (linguistics)
- List of interjections by language at Wiktionary
  - English interjections at Wiktionary
- Category: Interjections
- Vocable
