= Allen Walker Read =

American etymologist and folklorist

- Born: June 2, 1906
- Died: October 16, 2002
- Education: University of Northern Iowa (B.A) University of Iowa (M.A.) Oxford University (Rhodes Scholarship, D.Litt.)
- Occupations: Etymologist, lexicographer

Allen Walker Read (June 2, 1906 – October 16, 2002) was an American etymologist and lexicographer. Born in Minnesota, he spent much of his career as a professor at Columbia University in New York. Read's work Classic American Graffiti is well regarded in the study of latrinalia and obscenity. His etymological career included his discovery of the origin of the word "OK", a longtime puzzle, and his scholarly study of the history and use of the common English vulgarity "fuck."

== Early life and education ==
Read was born in Winnebago, Minnesota to Orlan and Bessie Allen Reed on 2 June 1906. He had one sibling, a sister, Mary Jo; she became a professor of geography at Eastern Illinois University. He earned a bachelor's degree from the University of Northern Iowa (called Iowa State Teachers College at the time) in 1925 and a master's degree from the University of Iowa in 1926. His thesis focused on Iowa place names. Read studied at St Edmund Hall, Oxford as a Rhodes Scholar from 1928 to 1931.

== Career ==
He became a professor at the University of Chicago beginning in 1931, working on William Craigie's Dictionary of American English. Read's 1934 article in American Speech, titled "An Obscenity Symbol", is a study of the word "fuck" from a sociological perspective. In 2014, Jesse Sheidlower, the president of the American Dialect Society, called it "the most important article" written about the term, noting that ironically, Read's 14-page essay avoided using the word directly, referring to it euphemistically instead.

=== Classic American Graffiti ===
Read's first extended work, Lexical Evidence from Folk Epigraphy in Western North America: A Glossarial Study of the Low Element in the English Vocabulary, describes and collates examples of bathroom graffiti observed by Read on a road trip throughout the Western United States in 1928. The book was privately published at his own expense in Paris in 1935, since its extensive inclusion of vulgarity was considered too obscene by American publishers. Even then, the printing was limited to 75 copies and contained a disclaimer that it should be "restricted to students of linguistics, folk-lore... and allied branches of social science." Read wrote in a foreword:

Judged merely as reading matter, the following work (apart from the Introduction) is abominably, incredibly obscene, and the compiler begs that any one will lay this book down who is not prepared to look at all social phenomenon with the dispassionate eye of the anthropologist and the student of abnormal psychology.

It was eventually published in the United States in 1977, under the title Classic American Graffiti, ISBN 0-916500-06-3, by Reinhold Aman's Maledicta Press. The work was described as a prototypical "model study" of latrinalia that "deserves the attention of any serious student of American language" in a 1979 review, which noted that even then it remained hard to access and "excessively rare." It contains some of the earliest documentation in English of words used by the homosexual community, although Read never recorded the word "gay", implying that the term was not used to mean homosexual during this time period. The work also contained Read's concept of the inverted taboo, in which some people delight in vulgarity because of its illicit nature.

=== Other work ===
From 1938 onwards, he worked intermittently on a dictionary of Britishisms, but was never able to complete it during his life. During World War II, he did his service with the Military Intelligence Division, working on the American Military Definition Dictionary and Military Phrase Books. He was a chaired professor at Columbia University in New York City from 1945 until 1974. In 1948, H.L. Mencken wrote that Read ''probably knows more about early Americanisms than anyone else on earth.''

The origin of "OK", one of the most common English words, had been considered one of English's biggest etymological mysteries, with a number of competing theories. Read unveiled the actual origin of the word in a series of articles published in American Speech between 1963 and 1964. This achievement was described as "the pinnacle of his career" to "envious fellow etymologists" by The Economist, but Read considered it just "an agreeable diversion from his main work."

Read also successfully traced the origins of the words "dixie" and "podunk", and managed to attribute the first use of "the almighty dollar" to Washington Irving. He wrote the entry for "dictionary" in the Encyclopaedia Britannica. Read's career included studies of euphemisms, graffiti, slang, pig Latin, doubletalk, and adult baby talk. He also had a professional interest in folklore and place names; he was a founder of the American Names Society and served as its president in 1969.

Read served as the head of the International Linguistic Association, and also as the President of the Semiotic Society of America in 1980. In 1987, Read turned over his work on Britishisms, consisting of more than 100,000 citations, to John Algeo for completion. At an advanced age, Read finally completed his doctorate at Oxford, receiving a D.Litt. in 1988.

== Personal life ==
A colleague described Read as "never a snob, never old-fashioned", and wrote that Read embraced language in all its multifariousness, opining that "language is culture itself." He married Charlotte Schuchardt, director of the Institute of General Semantics, in 1953. The couple tended to combine academic conferences with opportunities for hiking and mountain climbing. They had no children, and remained together until she died on 15 July 2002. Read died in New York City on 16 October 2002.
