= Aizuchi =

Japanese backchannel responses in conversation

In the Japanese language, aizuchi (Japanese: 相槌 or あいづち, IPA: [aizɯtɕi]) are interjections during a conversation that indicate the listener is paying attention or understands the speaker (backchanneling). In linguistic terms, these are a form of phatic expression. Aizuchi are considered reassuring to the speaker, indicating that the listener is active and involved in the discussion.

== Examples ==
Example of backchanneling in Japanese: un

Example of multiple backchannels in Japanese

Common aizuchi include:

- hai (はい), ee (ええ), or un (うん; "yes", with varying degrees of formality)
- sō desu ne (そうですね; "I see")
- sō desu ka (そうですか; "is that so?", "really?")
- hontō (本当), hontō ni (本当に), maji (マジ), or (in Kansai) honma (本真; "really?")
- naruhodo (なるほど; "I see", "that's right")
- nodding These have a similar function to English "yeah", "yup", "OK", "really?", "uh-huh", "oh", and so on.

Aizuchi are frequently misinterpreted by non-native speakers as the listener showing agreement and approval. Business relations in particular can be hampered by non-native speakers assuming that their Japanese counterparts have been agreeing to their suggestions all along, especially with hai (はい; "yes"), when the native Japanese speaker meant only that they follow or understand the suggestions – "got it", not "agreed".

Aizuchi can also take the form of so-called echo questions, which consist of a noun plus desu ka (ですか). After Speaker A asks a question, Speaker B may repeat a key noun followed by desu ka to confirm what Speaker A was talking about or simply to keep communication open while Speaker B thinks of an answer. A rough English analog would be "A ..., you say?", as in: "So I bought this new car"; reply: "A car, you say?".

== See also ==
- Backchannel (linguistics)
