= Albigence Waldo Putnam =

American lawyer & historian (1799-1869)

- Born: March 11, 1799; Marietta, Northwest Territory, U.S.
- Died: January 20, 1869 (aged 69); Nashville, Tennessee, U.S.
- Occupations: lawyer historian
- Relatives: Israel Putnam (ancestor)

Albigence Waldo Putnam (born in Marietta, Ohio, 11 March 1799; died in Nashville, Tennessee, 20 January 1869) was an American lawyer and historian.

== Biography ==
He studied law, practiced in Mississippi, and in 1836 settled in Nashville, Tennessee, and was president of the Tennessee Historical Society, to whose publications he was a contributor. In addition to articles in periodicals, he wrote:

- History of Middle Tennessee (Nashville, 1859)
- Life and Times of Gen. James Robertson (1859)
- “Life of Gen. John Sevier,” in Wheeler's History of North Carolina
