= Backchannel (linguistics) =

Conversational responses that can be verbal or non-verbal

In linguistics, a backchanneling during a conversation occurs when one participant is speaking and another participant interjects responses to the speaker. A backchannel response can be verbal, non-verbal, or both. Backchannel responses are often phatic expressions, primarily serving a social or meta-conversational purpose, such as signifying the listener's attention, understanding, sympathy, or agreement, rather than conveying significant information. Examples of backchanneling in English include such expressions as yeah, OK, uh-huh, hmm, right, and I see.

dialog fragment with backchannels: "... yeah ... yeah, yeah ..."

== Definition and use ==
The term was coined by Victor Yngve in 1970, in the following passage: "In fact, both the person who has the turn and his partner are simultaneously engaged in both speaking and listening. This is because of the existence of what I call the back channel, over which the person who has the turn receives short messages such as 'yes' and 'uh-huh' without relinquishing the turn." Backchannel responses are a part of basic human interaction because to have a productive or meaningful person-person interaction humans must cooperate with one another when participating in a conversation. Meaning, when two people are involved in a conversation, at any given moment only one person is primarily speaking and the other is primarily listening, yet the listener is often giving minor messages through backchannel responses.

The term backchannel was designed to imply that there are two channels of communication operating simultaneously during a conversation. The predominant channel is the speaker who directs primary speech flow. The secondary channel of communication—or backchannel—is the listener providing continuers or assessments, defining the listener's comprehension and/or interest. Recent research, which can be seen below, has also suggested new terms for these two functions. They have proposed the term generic in place of continuers and specific in place of assessments.

Usually, the way backchannel is used would be a person telling a story or explaining something to one or more individuals, involved in a conversation, who would respond to them with short verbal messages or non-verbal body language. In order to indicate that they are listening and paying attention to the speaker, they might produce sounds as "right", "yeah", etc. or give a nod. Such acknowledgments or small gestures help the speaker understand that the listeners are interested and that they should go on with their story.

In recent years, scholars have challenged the mainstream definition by adding "optionality" in the definition of backchannel. The use of backchannel is never necessary and is always a supplement to a pre-existing conversation.

=== Language differences ===
Backchannel communication is present in all cultures and languages, though frequency and use may vary. For example, backchannel responses also appear in sign languages. Confusion or distraction can occur during an intercultural encounter if participants from both parties are not accustomed to the same backchannel norms. For example, German speakers produce smaller backchannel responses and use back channel responses less frequently than in American English.

Japanese backchannels are frequently misinterpreted by non-native speakers as the listener showing agreement and approval. Business relations in particular can be hampered by non-native speakers assuming that their Japanese counterparts have been agreeing to their suggestions all along, especially with the word hai (はい; "yes"), when the native Japanese speaker meant only that they understand the suggestions – "got it", not "agreed". Japanese speakers also backchannel through the use of echo questions formed by adding the question marker desu ka (ですか) to a key noun in the speaker's sentence which can sound very repetitive to speakers of other languages.

Studies have shown that when people learn a second language they learn or adapt to how people that are native speakers of that language use backchannel responses. This may occur in terms of the frequency at which a person produces backchannel responses or the sounds or gestures of those responses.

== Types ==
Research in recent years has expanded the set of recognized backchannel responses to include sentence completions, requests for clarification, brief statements, and non-verbal responses. These have been categorised as non-lexical, phrasal, or substantive.

=== Non-lexical backchannels ===
A non-lexical backchannel is a vocalized sound that has little or no referential meaning but still verbalizes the listener's attention, and that frequently co-occurs with gestures. In English, sounds like uh-huh and hmm serve this role. Non-lexical backchannels generally come from a limited set of sounds not otherwise widely used in content-bearing conversational speech; as a result, they can be used to express support, surprise, or a need for clarification at the same time as someone else's conversational turn without causing confusion or interference.

English allows for the reduplication, or repetition, of syllables within a non-lexical backchannel, such as in responses like uh-huh, mm-hm, or um-hm, as well as for single-syllable backchanneling. In a study examining the use of two-syllable backchannels that focused on mm and mm-hm, Gardner found that the two tokens are generally not identical in function, with mm being used more productively as a continuer, a weak acknowledgment token, and a weak assessment marker. In contrast, mm-hm is generally used as a backchannel to signal that the speaker is yielding their conversational turn and allowing the other speaker to maintain control of the conversational floor.

=== Phrasal and substantive backchannels ===
One of the conversational functions of phrasal backchannels is to assess or appraise a previous utterance. Goodwin argues that this is the case for the phrasal backchannel oh wow, where use of the backchannel requires a specific conversational context where something unexpected or surprising was said. Similarly, more substantive backchannels such as Oh come on, are you serious? require a context where the speaker is responding to something exasperating or frustrating. In both of these cases, Goodwin argues that the backchannels focus only on addressing some aspect of the immediately preceding utterance rather than the larger conversation itself. They can appear both in the middle of extended talk as well as at the end of longer conversational turns.

== Recent research ==
Research in 2000 has pushed back on the notion of backchannels, in which the listener's role is merely to receive information provided by the speaker. Bavelas, Coates, and Johnson put forth evidence that listeners' responses help shape the content of the speaker's utterances. They grouped acknowledgment tokens into two categories: generic and specific. Generic responses could be considered backchannels and would include mm hm and yeah, while specific responses would involve a reaction to the given content. Examples might include Oh! or a facial display of concern.

They transcribed students telling a fellow participant about a close call experience that they had had. With one group of participants, they had the listener perform another task to distract them from the story being told. The researchers asked independent reviewers to code the verbal and visual responses of the narration events as generic or specific. They also asked other independent reviewers to gauge the quality of the narration in each case.

They concluded that the responses from the distracted listeners included significantly fewer specific responses than from the undistracted listeners. In addition, they found that the quality of the narration was dramatically lower when the listener was distracted. Their basic contention was that listeners are co-narrators and help the storyteller in his or her narration. In other words, a storyteller tells a better story with an audience that is engaged than one that is not.

Tolins and Foxtree have also published research demonstrating how backchannel communication influences speakers. Their research was specifically looking at how speakers respond to generic responses compared to specific responses.

In 2017, Kyoto University's Graduate program of Informatics began developing a robot to assist individuals, more specifically the elderly, with mental health through the use of attentive listening. They utilized backchannel generation as a method for the robot to have some form of feedback to feel like a real conversation. Further research is being conducted to be more practical.

In 1997 there was a study on 205,000 telephone utterances that showed 19% of those constituted a "backchannel". This study was a part of a new method of "discourse detection" and "statistical modeling" that allowed them to have such a large sample size, giving the possibility of generalizing this data to larger communities.

== See also ==
- Aizuchi
- Phatic expression
