= Uninflected word =

Term in linguistic morphology

In linguistic morphology, an uninflected word is a word that has no morphological markers (inflection) such as affixes, ablaut, consonant gradation, etc., indicating declension or conjugation. If a word has an uninflected form, this is usually the form used as the lemma for the word.

In English and many other languages, uninflected words include prepositions, interjections, and conjunctions, often called invariable words. These cannot be inflected under any circumstances (unless they are used as different parts of speech, as in "ifs and buts").

Only words that cannot be inflected at all are called "invariable". In the strict sense of the term "uninflected", only invariable words are uninflected, but in broader linguistic usage, these terms are extended to be inflectable words that appear in their basic form. For example, English nouns are said to be uninflected in the singular, while they show inflection in the plural (represented by the affix -s/-es). The term "uninflected" can also refer to uninflectability with respect to one or more, but not all, morphological features; for example, one can say that Japanese verbs are uninflected for person and number, but they do inflect for tense, politeness, and several moods and aspects.

In the strict sense, among English nouns only mass nouns (such as sand, information, or equipment) are truly uninflected, since they have only one form that does not change; count nouns are always inflected for number, even if the singular inflection is shown by an "invisible" affix (the null morpheme). In the same way, English verbs are inflected for person and tense even if the morphology showing those categories is realized as null morphemes. In contrast, other analytic languages like Mandarin Chinese have true uninflected nouns and verbs, where the notions of number and tense are completely absent.

In many inflected languages, such as Greek and Russian, some nouns and adjectives of foreign origin are left uninflected in contexts where native words would be inflected; for instance, the name Abraam in Greek (from Hebrew), the Modern Greek word μπλε ble (from French bleu), the Italian word computer, and the Russian words кенгуру, kenguru (kangaroo) and пальто, pal'to (coat, from French paletot).

In German, all modal particles are uninflected.

== See also ==
- Grammatical particle
- Lemma (morphology)
- Null morpheme
