= OOA =

OOA may mean:

- Object-oriented analysis
- Old Order Amish
- Open-ocean aquaculture
- Out of Africa
- Out of Africa theory
- The Legend of Zelda: Oracle of Ages, a video game

== See also ==
- OA (disambiguation)
- OO (disambiguation)
- Out of Africa (disambiguation)
