= Ōmae =

Ōmae, Omae, Oomae or Ohmae (written: 大前) is a Japanese surname. Notable people with the surname include:

- Ao Omae (大前 粟生, born 1992), Japanese fiction writer
- Akane Omae (大前 茜, born 1982), Japanese voice actress
- Akiko Omae (大前 綾希子, born 1993), Japanese tennis player
- Genki Omae (大前 元紀, born 1989), Japanese footballer
- Kenichi Ohmae (大前 研一, born 1943), Japanese business theorist and writer
- Shigeo Omae (大前 繁雄, born 1942), Japanese politician
- Toshikazu Omae (大前 敏一, 1902–1978), Japanese naval officer and author
