= Ethan Haas =

Ethan Haas can refer to:

- A character on the TV show Masters of Sex
- A character on the TV show The Class
- A character related to an alternate reality game entitled Ethan Haas Was Right
