= Alpha and Omega (disambiguation) =

Alpha and Omega is an appellation of Christ and God in the Book of Revelation.

Alpha and Omega and similar titles may also refer to:

== Film, television, and radio ==
- Alpha and Omega (film series), a series of eight animated films produced by Crest Animation Productions
  - Alpha and Omega (film), a 2010 animated comedy-drama film and a series of direct-to-DVD videos
- "Alpha and Omega" (Dark), a 2017 episode of Dark
- "Alpha and Omega" (Supernatural), a 2016 episode of Supernatural
- Alpha and Omega (radio plays), a pair of radio dramas by Mike Walker first aired by the BBC World Service in 2001 and 2002
- Alpha and Omega, the doomsday bomb in Beneath the Planet of the Apes
- Alpha-Omega, a military faction in War for the Planet of the Apes

== Games ==
- Alpha and Omega, another name for the word game Word chain
- Alpha Omega (board game), a 1977 board wargame published by Battleline Publications
- Alpha Omega (role-playing game), developed by Mind Storm Labs
- Pokémon Omega Ruby and Alpha Sapphire, remakes of the Pokémon Japanese role-playing games Pokémon Ruby and Sapphire

== Literature ==
- Alpha and Omega (Harrison), a 1915 collection of essays, lectures, and letters written by Jane Ellen Harrison
- Alpha & Omega (book), a 2003 book by Charles Seife
- Alpha and Omega, a 2007 novella by Patricia Briggs and the name for a series of subsequent novels
- Alpha and Omega, a 2019 supernatural thriller novel by Harry Turtledove
- Alpha & Omega, the final arc of the Locke & Key comic
- Omegaverse, a literary subgenre focusing on dynamics between characters labeled Alphas, Betas, and Omegas, popularized by slash fiction

== Music ==
- Alpha & Omega (band), a British dub/reggae duo
- Alpha & Omega Recording, the San Rafael, California recording studio of American music producer Sandy Pearlman
- Alpha and Omega (Bizzy Bone album), 2004
- Alpha and Omega (Tonus Peregrinus album), 2008
- Alpha and Omega (Jelena Karleuša albums), 2023
- Alpha Omega (Cro-Mags album), 1992
- Alpha Omega (Cheek album), 2015
- "Alpha Omega", a bootleg compilation of tracks by The Beatles which prompted the release of the official 1962–1966 and 1967–1970 compilations
- Danza IIII: The Alpha – The Omega, The Tony Danza Tapdance Extravaganza album, 2012
- "Alpha and Omega", a track off of Boards of Canada's 2002 album Geogaddi
- "Alpha Omega", a track off of Architects' 2012 album Daybreaker
- "Alpha Omega", a track off of Karnivool's 2013 album Asymmetry

== Other uses ==
- Alpha and Omega, California gold rush towns, now honored as the historical landmark of Alpha Hydraulic Diggings
- Alpha et Omega, an occult order initially named the Hermetic Order of the Golden Dawn
- Alpha Omega (fraternity), a professional Jewish dental fraternity
- Alpha Omega (local), a local men's residence at Grove City College

== See also ==
- Alpha (disambiguation)
- AO (disambiguation)
- Omega (disambiguation)
