= Lexeme =

Unit of lexical meaning

A lexeme (/ˈlɛksiːm/) is a unit of lexical meaning that underlies a set of words that are related through inflection. It is a basic abstract unit of meaning, a unit of morphological analysis in linguistics that roughly corresponds to a set of forms taken by a single root word. For example, in the English language, run, runs, ran and running are forms of the same lexeme, which can be represented as RUN. (Note: RUN is here intended to display in small caps. Software limitations may result in its display either in full-sized capitals (RUN) or in full-sized capitals of a smaller font. Either is regarded as an acceptable substitute for genuine small caps.)

One form, the lemma (or citation form), is chosen by convention as the canonical form of a lexeme. The lemma is the form used in dictionaries as an entry's headword. Other forms of a lexeme are often listed later in the entry if they are uncommon or irregularly inflected.

== Description ==
The notion of the lexeme is central to morphology, the basis for defining other concepts in that field. For example, the difference between inflection and derivation can be stated in terms of lexemes:

- Inflectional rules relate a lexeme to its forms.
- Derivational rules relate a lexeme to another lexeme.

A lexeme belongs to a particular syntactic category, has a certain meaning (semantic value), and in inflecting languages, has a corresponding inflectional paradigm. That is, a lexeme in many languages will have many different forms. For example, the lexeme RUN has a present third person singular form runs, a present non-third-person singular form run (which also functions as the past participle and non-finite form), a past form ran, and a present participle running. (It does not include runner, runners, runnable etc.) The use of the forms of a lexeme is governed by rules of grammar. In the case of English verbs such as RUN, they include subject–verb agreement and compound tense rules, which determine the form of a verb that can be used in a given sentence.

In many formal theories of language, lexemes have subcategorization frames to account for the number and types of complements. They occur within sentences and other syntactic structures.

== Decomposition ==
A language's lexemes are often composed of smaller units with individual meaning called morphemes, according to root morpheme + derivational morphemes + affix (not necessarily in that order), where:

- The root morpheme is the primary lexical unit of a word, which carries the most significant aspects of semantic content and cannot be reduced to smaller constituents.
- The derivational morphemes carry only derivational information.
- The affix is composed of all inflectional morphemes, and carries only inflectional information.

The compound root morpheme + derivational morphemes is often called the stem. The decomposition stem + desinence can then be used to study inflection.

== See also ==
- Ending (linguistics)
- Inflection
- Lemma
- Lexicon
- Lexical item
- Lexical word vs. grammatical word
- Marker (linguistics)
- Multiword expression
- Null morpheme
- Root (linguistics)
- Stem
- Syntagma (linguistics)
- Word family
