= A0 =

A0, A-0, A_{0}, or a_{0} may refer to:

== Mathematics, science, and technology ==
- A-0 System, an early compiler-related tool developed for electronic computers
- Bohr radius (accepted mathematical symbol "a_{0}")
- Hecke characters in number theory, previously called characters of type A_{0}
- Haplogroup A00 and A0; see Y-chromosomal Adam and Haplogroup A (Y-DNA)
- A0, a subdivision in stellar classification
- Non-breaking space, which has hexadecimal representation A0 (sometimes written 0xA0) in many encoding standards

== Roads ==
- A0 highway (Zimbabwe), a highway which orbits Zimbabwe
- A0 road (Sri Lanka), an A-Grade road in Sri Lanka
- Bucharest Ring Motorway, The Bucharest Ring Motorway, termed A0

== Vehicles and engines ==
- 101 A0 and 103 A0, two versions of the German Heinkel Tourist moped
- A-0, a 1943 pre-production model of the German Walter HWK 509 liquid-fuel bipropellant rocket engine
- A-0, a 1938 variant of the German Siebel Si 204 transport and trainer aircraft
- He 177 A-0, a pre-production series of the 1942 German Heinkel He 177 heavy bomber
- Hs 126A-0, a variant of the 1937 German Henschel Hs 126 reconnaissance aircraft
- Ju 87 A-0, a variant of the 1936 German Junkers Ju 87 dive bomber aircraft
- Me 210A-0, a pre-production variant of the 1943 German Messerschmitt Me 210 heavy fighter aircraft
- Isaac Peral (A-0), a Spanish submarine

== Other uses ==
- A0 paper size, an international ISO 216 standard paper size (841 × 1189 mm), which results in an area very close to 1 m^{2}
- A0, the lowest A (musical note) note on a standard piano
- A0, a climbing grade
- A00, Irregular chess openings code in the Encyclopaedia of Chess Openings
- A00, an unofficial paper size twice the size of A0 paper size
- A-0 Geyser, a geyser in Yellowstone National Park
- L'Avion, a French airline (IATA designator A0)

== See also ==
- AO (disambiguation)
- 0A (disambiguation)
