= OA =

OA, O.A., Oa, or oa may refer to:

== Arts and entertainment ==
- Oa (comics), a fictional planet in the DC Comics universe
- The OA, a television series
- OpenArena, a video game
- Opie and Anthony (often "O&A"), a radio show
- Oriental Adventures, a Dungeons & Dragons sourcebook
- Orion's Arm, a science fiction project

== Businesses and organisations ==
- Obavještajna agencija, the Croatian Intelligence Agency
- Office administration
- Oficina Anticorrupción, an Argentine law enforcement agency
- Olympic Air (IATA code OA)
- Opera Australia, an opera company
- Opportunitas aequa, a Canadian organization
- Overeaters Anonymous
- Oxford Academy (California), a high school
- Orbital ATK, an aerospace company

== People ==
- Ma'am OA, nickname of Andrea Veneracion, founder of the Philippine Madrigal Singers
- Oskar Andersson, Swedish cartoonist who uses the pen name O.A.

== Places ==
- Oa (Attica), a deme of ancient Attica
- Ocean Acres, New Jersey, United States
- Orakzai Agency, Pakistan
- The Oa, Scotland, United Kingdom
- Oa (DC Comics), the base of two fictional groups of characters, the Guardians of the Universe and the Green Lantern Corps

== Honors ==
- Order of Australia, a formal honour
- Order of the Arrow, the honor society of Scouting America

== Science and technology ==
- Office automation
- Oleic acid, a fatty acid
- Open access, the free online availability of digital content from scholarly sources
- Operational amplifier, an electronic component
- Operational analysis, more generally called "operational research", a branch of applied mathematics
- Osteoarthritis, a disease
- Length overall (also o/a, o.a. or oa), an abbreviation for overall, used when describing the length of a ship
- Oxford Archaeology

== Other uses ==
- Oa (digraph)
- Obituaries Australia, an online database of obituaries
- Office Action, a communication from the U.S. Patent and Trademark Office
- Old Alleynian, an old boy of Dulwich College
- Old Albanian, an old boy of St Alban School, St Albans
- Order of Appearance, a synonym for Order of battle
- Output area, an area of approximately 100 households, derived from the UK Census

== See also ==
- 0A (disambiguation)
- OOA (disambiguation)
