= Spindle Geyser =

- Interactive map of Spindle Geyser
- Location: Lower Geyser Basin, Yellowstone National Park, Teton County, Wyoming
- Coordinates: 44°31′54″N 110°47′44″W
- Elevation: 7,346 feet (2,239 m)
- Type: Fountain geyser
- Eruption height: 1–10 ft (0.30–3.05 m)
- Frequency: 1-3 minutes
- Duration: few seconds
- Temperature: 89.3 °C (192.7 °F)

Spindle Geyser is a geyser in the Lower Geyser Basin of Yellowstone National Park in the U.S. state of Wyoming.

Spindle Geyser is part of the White Creek Group which includes A-0 Geyser and Botryoidal Spring. It is found along the bank of White Creek about ^{1}/_{2} mile (0.8 km) southeast of the Surprise Pool parking area.

It erupts for a duration of a few seconds with an interval of 1–3 minutes between eruptions. Eruptions tend to be small, sometimes no more than a vigorous roiling of the pool but can reach 1 to 3 feet (0.3 to 0.9 m). Prior to 1985, Spindle had eruptions as large as 10 feet (3.0 m). Spindle also generates subterranean thumps that can be felt when standing near the geyser.
