= AO =

AO, aO, Ao, or ao may refer to:

== Places ==
- Ao (building)
- Ao, Estonia, village in Väike-Maarja Parish, Lääne-Viru County, Estonia
- Ao Line, commuter railway line in Hyōgo Prefecture, Japan
- Ao River (Zhejiang) (鳌江), Zhejiang, China
- Ao River (Fujian) (敖江), Fujian, China
- Ao Station, railway station in the city of Ono, Hyōgo Prefecture, Japan
- Aodu, capital of Shang dynasty, near Zhengzhou
- Aoshima, Ehime, island in Japan
- Aoshima, Miyazaki, island in Japan
- Angola (ISO 3166-1 alpha-2 code AO)

== Arts and entertainment ==
- Adults Only, an entertainment rating
- AO Music (AOmusic), a world-music fusion group consisting of Jay Oliver, Miriam Stockley and others
- Ao: The Last Hunter, a 2010 prehistoric drama film
- Eureka Seven: AO, Japanese mecha anime television series
- Lord Ao, a fictional deity in the Dungeons & Dragons universe
- Annoying Orange, an American comedy web series

== Businesses and organizations ==
- AO (originally American Optical Company) eyeglass lenses, a brand now merged with Carl Zeiss Vision
- AO Foundation (originally Arbeitsgemeinschaft für Osteosynthesefragen), a non-profit organisation dedicated to the treatment of trauma and disorders of the musculoskeletal system
- AO Racing, an American sports car racing team
- AO World, a UK retailer of household appliances trading under the brand name ao.com
- AO, Aktsionernoye Obschestvo or Aktsionernoye Obshchestvo (акционерное общество), a type of Russian corporate entity; see open joint-stock company
- Athletics Ontario, formally Ontario Track and Field Association (OTAF)
- Australian Airlines (IATA code AO)
- Australian Open, one of the four major tennis tournaments held each year

== Government and politics ==
- Administrative Office of the United States Courts
- Administrative Officer (United Kingdom), a grade within the UK's Civil Service
- Administrative Officer (Hong Kong), a grade within the Hong Kong's Civil Service
- Autonomous oblast, type of Russian administrative division
- Autonomous okrug, type of Russian administrative division
- NSDAP/AO, Foreign Organization branch of the Nazi Party
- Officer of the Order of Australia, postnominal AO

== Military ==
- Area of operations, a U.S. military term
- A US Navy hull classification symbol: Fleet oiler (AO)
- AO-, the prefix for several firearms
- Aviation Ordnanceman, a US Navy occupational rating

== Philosophy and religion ==
- Alpha and Omega (abbreviation)
- Ao (Māori mythology), a deity in Māori mythology
- Ao (turtle), a creature in Chinese mythology
- Ao, a type of Easter Island wood carving

== Science and technology ==
- (697402) Ao, a main-belt asteroid
- .ao, top-level Internet domain code for Angola
- Acridine orange, a fluorescent dye
- Adaptive optics, an astronomical imaging technology
- Ambient occlusion, a shading method in computer graphics
- AMSAT-OSCAR, a satellite naming convention
- Applied Optics, scientific journal published by the Optical Society of America (OSA)
- Arctic oscillation, a climate pattern
- Atomic orbital, in physics and chemistry
- Ausenium, a misidentified chemical element (atomic symbol "Ao")
- Authorship obfuscation, a privacy technique

== Surnames and initials ==
- Ao (surname) (敖), a Chinese surname
- Ou (surname) (区/區 and 欧/歐), romanized as Ao in Cantonese
- Ao Omae (born 1992), Japanese fiction writer
- Aaron Owens (born 1976), American streetball player

== Other uses ==
- Alphabetically ordered
- Ao (color)
- Ao (digraph)
- Ao Naga, an ethnic group in northeastern India
- Ao language, a Tibeto-Burman (Sino-Tibetan) language spoken by the Ao Naga
- Central Naga languages, a Sino-Tibetan language family of India
- ao or außerordentlicher, meaning extraordinary professor (academic rank in Germany)
- Australian Open, an annual tennis tournament in Melbourne, Australia
- Aº, an abbreviation of "Anno", meaning "In the year" (as in Anno Domini)
- Te Ao Māori (literally "The Māori world"), Māori cultures and traditions

== See also ==
- Alpha and Omega (disambiguation)
- A0 (disambiguation)
- Ꜵ, a medieval norse ligature of A and O
- Å, a letter derived from A with an O above or beside it
