= Botryoidal Spring =

- Interactive map of Botryoidal Spring
- Location: Lower Geyser Basin, Yellowstone National Park, Teton County, Wyoming
- Coordinates: 44°32′06″N 110°47′58″W
- Elevation: 7,335 feet (2,236 m)
- Type: Geyser
- Eruption height: 10 feet (3.0 m)
- Frequency: 3-5 minutes
- Duration: one minute
- Temperature: 42.2 °C (108.0 °F)

Botryoidal Spring is a fountain-type geyser in the Lower Geyser Basin of Yellowstone National Park in the United States.

Botryoidal Spring is part of the White Creek Group, which includes A-0 Geyser and Spindle Geyser. As the name indicates, Botryoidal Spring was originally known as a hot spring. The term botryoidal refers to the subspherical, grape-like geyserite structures around the vent. In 1996, seismic activity resulted in the sparkling spring changing to an active geyser.

It erupts for about one minute. Intervals (between each shock) are 3 to 5 minutes. The fountain reaches a height of 10 feet (3 m).

Immediately after an eruption, the pool is quiet. Without any warning, eruptions start with a broad, moderately noisy burst. Smaller bursting continues for less than a minute. Eruptions may start with a blue bubble, caused by a large steam bubble rising from below the water surface.
