= Out of Africa (disambiguation) =

Out of Africa is a 1937 memoir by Karen Blixen.

Out of Africa may also refer to:

- Out of Africa (film), a 1985 film based on the book
- Early expansions of hominins out of Africa or "Out of Africa I", an anthropological theory of the first migration of early human species more than 200,000 years ago
- Recent African origin of modern humans, the model of the geographic origin of anatomically modern humans and "Out of Africa II", the subsequent expansion out of Africa from which all living non-African populations are derived

== Media ==
- Coronation Street: Out of Africa, a 2008 spin-off film from the British soap opera
- "Out of Africa" (After You've Gone), a 2007 television episode
- "Out of Africa" (ER), a 2003 television episode
- "Out of Africa" (Static Shock), a 2004 television episode

== Other uses ==
- Out of Africa Wildlife Park, a park and zoo in Arizona
