= Lemma (morphology) =

Root word of a set of word forms

In morphology and lexicography, a lemma (pl.: lemmas or lemmata) is the canonical form, dictionary form, or citation form of a set of word forms. In English, for example, break, breaks, broke, broken and breaking are forms of the same lexeme; however, break is the lemma under which each form thereof is indexed. Lexeme, in this context, refers to the set of all the inflected or alternating forms in the paradigm of a single word, and lemma refers to the particular form that is chosen by convention to represent the lexeme. Lemmas have special significance in highly inflected languages such as Arabic, Turkish, and Russian. The process of determining the lemma for a given lexeme is called lemmatisation. The lemma can be viewed as the chief of the principal parts, although lemmatisation is at least partly arbitrary.

== Morphology ==
The form of a word that is chosen to serve as the lemma is usually the least marked form, but there are several exceptions such as the use of the infinitive for verbs in some languages.

For English, the citation form of a noun is the singular (and non-possessive) form: mouse rather than mice. For multiword lexemes that contain possessive adjectives or reflexive pronouns, the citation form uses a form of the indefinite pronoun one: do one's best, perjure oneself. In European languages with grammatical gender, the citation form of regular adjectives and nouns is usually the masculine singular. If the language also has cases, the citation form is often the masculine singular nominative.

For many languages, the citation form of a verb is the infinitive: French aller, German gehen, Hindustani जाना/جانا, Spanish ir, Persian رفتن, Russian идти/ходить. English verbs usually have an infinitive, which in its bare form (without the particle to) is its least marked (for example, break is chosen over to break, breaks, broke, breaking, and broken); for defective verbs with no infinitive the present tense is used (for example, must has only one form while shall has no infinitive, and both lemmas are their lexemes' present tense forms). For Latin, Ancient Greek, Modern Greek, Bulgarian, and Albanian, the first person singular present tense is traditionally used, but some modern dictionaries use the infinitive instead (except for Albanian and Bulgarian, which lack infinitives; for contracted verbs in Ancient Greek, an uncontracted first person singular present tense is used to reveal the contract vowel: φιλέω philéō for φιλῶ philō "I love" [implying affection], ἀγαπάω agapáō for ἀγαπῶ agapō "I love" [implying regard]). Dictionaries of Sanskrit and Prakrit list verbs in their singular third person present tense form, rather than their infinitive. Finnish dictionaries list verbs not under their root, but under the first infinitive, marked with -(t)a, -(t)ä.

For Japanese, the non-past (present and future) tense is used. For Arabic the third-person singular masculine of the past/perfect tense is the least-marked form and is used for entries in modern dictionaries. In older dictionaries, which are still commonly used, the triliteral of the word, either a verb or a noun, is used. This is similar to Hebrew, which also uses the third-person singular masculine perfect form, e.g., ברא bara' create, כפר kaphar deny. Georgian uses the verbal noun, as does Bengali. For Korean, -da is attached to the stem.

In Tamil, an agglutinative language, the verb stem (which is also the imperative form – the least marked one) is often cited, e.g., இரு.

In Irish, words are highly inflected by case (genitive, nominative, dative and vocative) and by their place within a sentence because of initial mutations. The noun cainteoir, the lemma for the noun meaning "speaker", has a variety of forms: chainteoir, gcainteoir, cainteora, chainteora, cainteoirí, chainteoirí and gcainteoirí.

Some phrases are cited in a sort of lemma: Carthago delenda est (literally, "Carthage must be destroyed") is a common way of citing Cato, but what he said was nearer to censeo Carthaginem esse delendam ("I hold Carthage to be in need of destruction").

== Lexicography ==
In a dictionary, the lemma "go" represents the inflected forms "go", "goes", "going", "went", and "gone". The relationship between an inflected form and its lemma is usually denoted by an angle bracket, e.g., "went" < "go". Of course, the disadvantage of such simplifications is the inability to look up a declined or conjugated form of the word, but some dictionaries, like Webster's Dictionary, list "went". Multilingual dictionaries vary in how they deal with this issue: the Langenscheidt dictionary of German does not list ging (< gehen), but the Cassell does.

Lemmas or word stems are used often in corpus linguistics for determining word frequency. In that usage, the specific definition of "lemma" is flexible depending on the task it is being used for.

== Pronunciation ==
A word may have different pronunciations, depending on its phonetic environment (the neighbouring sounds) or on the degree of stress in a sentence. An example of the latter is the weak and strong forms of certain English function words like some and but (pronounced /sʌm/, /bʌt/ when stressed but /s(ə)m/, /bət/ when unstressed). Dictionaries usually give the pronunciation used when the word is pronounced alone (its isolation form) and with stress, but they may also note common weak forms of pronunciation.

== Difference between stem and lemma ==
The stem is the part of the word that never changes even when morphologically inflected; a lemma is the least marked form of the word. In linguistic analysis, the stem is defined more generally as a form without any of its possible inflectional morphemes (but including derivational morphemes and may contain multiple roots). When phonology is taken into account, the definition of the unchangeable part of the word is not useful, as can be seen in the phonological forms of the words in the preceding example: "produced" /prəˈdjuːst/ vs. "production" /prəˈdʌkʃən/.

Some lexemes have several stems but one lemma. For instance the verb "to go" has the stems "go" and "went" due to suppletion: the past tense was co-opted from a different verb, "to wend".

== Headword ==
A headword or catchword is the lemma under which a set of related dictionary or encyclopaedia entries appears. The headword is used to locate the entry, and dictates its alphabetical position. Depending on the size and nature of the dictionary or encyclopedia, the entry may include alternative meanings of the word, its etymology, pronunciation and inflections, related lemmas such as compound words or phrases that contain the headword, and encyclopedic information about the concepts represented by the word.

For example, the headword bread may contain the following (simplified) definitions:

Bread
(noun)
- A common food made from the combination of flour, water and yeast
- Money (slang)
(verb)
- To coat in breadcrumbs
— to know which side your bread is buttered to know how to act in your own best interests.

The Academic Dictionary of Lithuanian contains around 500,000 headwords. The Oxford English Dictionary (OED) has around 273,000 headwords along with 220,000 other lemmas, while Webster's Third New International Dictionary has about 470,000. The Deutsches Wörterbuch (DWB), the largest lexicon of the German language, has around 330,000 headwords. These values are cited by the dictionary makers and may not use exactly the same definition of a headword. In addition, headwords may not accurately reflect a dictionary's physical size. The OED and the DWB, for instance, include exhaustive historical reviews and exact citations from source documents not usually found in standard dictionaries.

The term 'lemma' comes from the practice in Greco-Roman antiquity of using the word to refer to the headwords of marginal glosses in scholia; for this reason, the Ancient Greek plural form is sometimes used, namely lemmata (Greek λῆμμα, pl. λήμματα).

== Conventions ==
Many dictionaries list all forms of a term combined as one entry under a single headword. The form chosen for the headword is then governed by some common conventions.

=== Nouns ===
For languages with grammatical case, the headword takes the form of the nominative case, used when the noun serves as the subject (grammar) of a sentence. (Archaic Indo-Aryan languages like Sanskrit and Prakrit are a rare exception: nominal headwords take the vocative case, when the noun is used to address someone.) Unless it concerns a plurale tantum, the singular is used. For example, the Latin word for "rose" will traditionally be listed under the entry rosa, together with its inflected forms (rosae, rosam, rosarum, rosis) – if these are given at all. Some languages have separate forms for a male and female sense of a noun, as in French chanteur (for a male singer) and chanteuse (for a female singer). The female form may then be listed under the male form, which is used as the headword.

=== Adjectives ===
As for nouns, adjectives are listed in the nominative singular (for languages that inflect for grammatical case or number). If adjectives are inflected for gender, the masculine form is traditionally used for the headword. This headword may also serve as the headword for the comparative and superlative, even when these are irregular, as in good – better – best.

=== Verbs ===
For most languages, the traditional headword of a verb is its infinitive form. Notable exceptions are Latin and Ancient Greek; for these, the traditional choice is the first-person singular. So a traditional Latin dictionary has an entry dico (meaning "I say"), and not dicere ("to say"). Likewise, for Ancient Greek the traditional headword is the first-person singular λέγω (legō), and not the infinitive λέγειν (legein). Modern Greek has no infinitives; again, the first-person singular is used. The same holds for Bulgarian, while for Macedonian the third-person singular is used. Sanskrit and Prakrit verbal headwords are in their singular third person present tense form, rather than their infinitive.

Infinitives and other verb forms may be marked for tense, aspect and voice; the headword of choice is usually as unmarked as possible, which for many languages may correspond to present tense, imperfective aspect and active voice. In languages with deponent verbs, which have no active forms, the middle or passive voice is used for such verbs. For example, the Latin verb for "follow" will be found under sequor ("I follow").

== See also ==
- Lexeme
- Lexical item
- Lexical Markup Framework
- Null morpheme
- Principal parts
- Root (linguistics)
- Uninflected word
