= Null morpheme =

Morpheme with no phonetic form

In morphology, a null morpheme or zero morpheme is a morpheme that has no phonetic form. In simpler terms, a null morpheme is an "invisible" affix. It is a concept useful for analysis, by contrasting null morphemes with alternatives that do have some phonetic realization. The null morpheme is represented as either the figure zero (0) or the empty set symbol ∅.

In most languages, it is the affixes that are realized as null morphemes, indicating that the derived form does not differ from the stem. For example, plural form sheep can be analyzed as combination of sheep with added null affix for the plural. The process of adding a null affix is called null affixation, null derivation or zero derivation. The concept was first used by the 4th century BCE Sanskrit grammarian from ancient India, Pāṇini, in his Sanskrit grammar.

== In English ==
=== Inflection ===
The existence of a null morpheme in a word can also be theorized by contrast with other forms of the same word showing alternative morphemes. For example, the singular number of English nouns is shown by a null morpheme that contrasts with the plural morpheme -s.

- cat = cat + -∅ = ROOT ("cat") + SINGULAR
- cats = cat + -s = ROOT ("cat") + PLURAL

In addition, there are some cases in English where a null morpheme indicates plurality in nouns that take on irregular plurals.

- sheep = sheep + -∅ = ROOT ("sheep") + SINGULAR
- sheep = sheep + -∅ = ROOT ("sheep") + PLURAL

Also, a null morpheme marks the present tense of English verbs in all forms but the third person singular:

- (I) run = run + -∅ = ROOT ("run") + PRESENT: Non-3rd-SINGULAR
- (He) runs = run + -s = ROOT ("run") + PRESENT: 3rd-SINGULAR

=== Derivation ===
According to some linguists' view, English verbs such as to clean, to slow, to warm are converted from adjectives by a null morpheme – in contrast to verbs such as to widen or to enable which are also converted from adjectives, but using non-null morphemes. Null derivation, also known as conversion if the word class changes, is very common in analytic languages such as English.

== In other languages ==
In languages that show the above distinctions, it is quite common to employ null affixation to mark singular number, present tense and third persons. It is also frequent to find null affixation for the least-marked cases (the nominative case in nominative–accusative languages, and the absolutive case in ergative–absolutive languages). English is unusual in its marking of the third person singular with a non-zero morpheme, by contrast with a null morpheme for others. Another unusual usage of the null morpheme is the feminine genitive case plural in most Slavic languages, cf. Russian singular nominative женщин-а (zhenshchin-a), woman, singular genitive женщин-ы (zhenshchin-y), woman's and plural genitive женщин-∅ (zhenshchin-∅), women's.

In most languages of the world it is the affixes that are realized as null morphemes. But in some cases roots may also be realized as these. For instance, the Russian word вы-∅-ну-ть (vynut', 'to take out') consists of one prefix (вы-), one zero root (-∅-), and two suffixes (-ну- and -ть).

A basic radical element plus a null morpheme is not the same as an uninflected word, though usage may make those equal in practice.

== See also ==
- Covert (linguistics)
- Ellipsis (linguistics)
- Lemma (morphology)
- Marker (linguistics)
- Null allomorph
- Zero (linguistics)
- Disfix
