= Verde Valley Archaeology Center =

Museum in Arizona

- Location within Arizona Location within the United States
- Established: 2010
- Location: 460 Finnie Flat Rd, Camp Verde, AZ 86322
- Coordinates: 34.5661°N 111.8624°W
- Type: History museum
- Founder: Ken Zoll
- Executive director: Monica Buckle
- President: Ed Goodwin
- Website: www.verdevalleyarchaeology.org

The Verde Valley Archaeology Center, commonly abbreviated as VVAC, is a museum and 501(c)(3) nonprofit organization in Camp Verde, Arizona. Founded in 2010, the museum contains exhibits on Native American culture in the Verde Valley and offers educational programs. It also hosts the Verde Valley Archaeology Fair and the International Archaeology Film Festival.

== History ==
The museum was founded in 2010 by Ken Zoll and seven of his colleagues, who were fellow retirees. In 2015, Scott Simonton donated a plot of land containing Native American pit-houses, which was used to build a heritage garden. In 2021, it moved from its location on 385 S. Main St to a 11,000 sq ft (1,000 m^{2}) facility at 460 Finnie Flat Rd.

== Exhibits ==
The museum contains a 15 acres (6.1 ha) Native American Heritage Garden above 8-10 underground Native American pit-houses and hearths off-site. An educational pathway runs through the garden. The pathway contains exhibits featuring Native American hunting gear, a wickiup, and a garden of plants used by Natives when they inhabited the area. The museum also has a library containing over 2,000 books.

The museum contains many murals created by local Native American artists. The Grand Canyon Museum Collection of Grand Canyon National Park loaned some of its artifacts relating to the canyon to the museum. Other exhibits include ancient ceramics and their sherds, blue ores (azurite, malachite, and hematite), agricultural and food-related artifacts, an art gallery, and textile arts. The painter Paul Dyck is the namesake of many exhibits.

It temporarily displayed the Camp Verde Meteorite in 2015 as it was on loan from the Arizona State University's Center for Meteorite Studies.
