= Allomorph =

Variant pronunciation of a morpheme

In linguistics, an allomorph is a variant phonetic form of a morpheme, or in other words, a unit of meaning that varies in sound and spelling without changing the meaning. The term allomorph describes the realization of phonological variations for a specific morpheme. The different allomorphs that a morpheme can become are governed by morphophonemic rules. These phonological rules determine what phonetic form, or specific pronunciation, a morpheme will take based on the phonological or morphological context in which it appears.

== In English ==
English has several morphemes that vary in sound but not in meaning, such as past tense morphemes, plural morphemes, and negative morphemes.

=== Past tense allomorphs ===
For example, an English past tense morpheme is -ed, which occurs in several allomorphs depending on its phonological environment by assimilating the voicing of the previous segment or the insertion of a schwa after an alveolar stop. A possible set of assimilations is:

- as [-əd] or [-ɪd] (schwi) in verbs whose stem ends with the alveolar stops [t] or [d], such as 'hunted' [hʌntɪd] or 'banded' [bændɪd]
- as [-t] in verbs whose stem ends with voiceless phonemes other than [t], such as 'fished' [fɪʃt]
- as [-d] in verbs whose stem ends with voiced phonemes other than [d], such as 'buzzed' [bʌzd]

The "other than" restrictions above are typical for allomorphy. If the allomorphy conditions are ordered from most restrictive (in this case, after an alveolar stop) to least restrictive, the first matching case usually has precedence. Thus, the above conditions could be rewritten as follows:

- as [-əd] or [-ɪd] when the stem ends with the alveolar stops [t] or [d]
- as [-t] when the stem ends with voiceless phonemes
- as [-d] elsewhere

The [-t] allomorph does not appear after stem-final /t/ although the latter is voiceless, which is then explained by [-əd] appearing in that environment, together with the fact that the environments are ordered (that is, listed in order of priority). Likewise, the [-d] allomorph does not appear after stem-final [d] because the earlier clause for the /-əd/ allomorph has priority. The /-d/ allomorph does not appear after stem-final voiceless phoneme because the preceding clause for the [-t] comes first.

Irregular past tense forms, such as "broke" or "was/were," can be seen as still more specific cases since they are confined to certain lexical items, such as the verb "break," which take priority over the general cases listed above.

=== Plural allomorphs ===
The plural morpheme for regular nouns in English is typically realized by adding an -s or -es to the end of the noun. However, the plural morpheme actually has three different allomorphs: [-s], [-z], and [-əz]. The specific pronunciation that a plural morpheme takes on is determined by a set of morphological rules such as the following:

- assume that the basic form of the plural morpheme, /-z/, is [-z] ("bags" /bægz/)
- the morpheme /-z/ becomes [-əz] by inserting an [ə] before [-z] when a noun ends in a sibilant ("buses" /bʌsəz/)
- change the morpheme /-z/ to a voiceless [-s] when a noun ends in a voiceless sound ("caps" /kæps/)

=== Negative allomorphs ===
In English, the negative prefix in- has three allomorphs: [ɪn-], [ɪŋ-], and [ɪm-]. The phonetic form that the negative morpheme /ɪn-/ uses is determined by a set of morphological rules; for example:

- the negative morpheme /ɪn-/ becomes [ɪɱ-] when preceding a labiodental fricative ("invisible"/ɪɱˈvɪzᵻbl̴/)
- the morpheme /ɪn-/ becomes [ɪŋ-] before a velar consonant ("incongruous" /ɪŋˈkɔŋgruəs/)
- the morpheme /ɪn-/ becomes [ɪm-] before a bilabial consonant ("improper" /ɪmˈprɔpər/)

== In Sámi languages ==
The Sámi languages have a trochaic pattern of alternating stressed and unstressed syllables. The vowels and consonants that are allowed in an unstressed syllable differ from those that are allowed in a stressed syllable. Consequently, every suffix and inflectional ending has two forms, and the form that is used depends on the stress pattern of the word to which it is attached. For example, Northern Sámi has the causative verb suffix -hit/-ahttit in which -hit is selected when it would be the third syllable (and the preceding verb has two syllables), and -ahttit is selected when it would be the third and the fourth syllables (and the preceding verb has three syllables):

- goar·rut has two syllables and so when suffixed, the result is goa·ru·hit.
- na·nos·mit has three syllables and so when suffixed, the result is na·nos·mah·ttit.

The same applies to inflectional patterns in the Sami languages as well, which are divided into even stems and odd stems.

== Stem allomorphy ==
Allomorphy can also exist in stems or roots, as in Classical Sanskrit:

Vāk (voice)
	Singular	Plural
Nominative	/vaːk/	/vaːt͡ʃ-as/
Genitive	/vaːt͡ʃ-as/	/vaːt͡ʃ-aːm/
Instrumental	/vaːt͡ʃ-aː/	/vaːɡ-bʱis/
Locative	/vaːt͡ʃ-i/	/vaːk-ʂi/

There are three allomorphs of the stem, /vaːk/, /vaːt͡ʃ/, and /vaːɡ/, which are conditioned by the particular case-marking suffixes.

The form of the stem /vaːk/, found in the nominative singular and locative plural, is the etymological form of the morpheme. Pre-Indic palatalization of velars resulted in the variant form /vaːt͡ʃ/, which was initially phonologically conditioned. The conditioning can still be seen in the locative singular form, for which the /t͡ʃ/ is followed by the high front vowel /i/.

However, the subsequent merging of /e/ and /o/ into /a/ made the alternation unpredictable on phonetic grounds in the genitive case (both singular and plural) as well as the nominative plural and the instrumental singular. Thus, allomorphy was no longer directly relatable to phonological processes.

Phonological conditioning also accounts for the /vaːɡ/ form in the instrumental plural, in which the /ɡ/ assimilates in voicing to the following /bʱ/.

== History ==
The term was originally used to describe variations in chemical structure.

== See also ==
- Null allomorph
- Alternation (linguistics)
- Allophone
- Consonant mutation
- Grassmann's law
- Suppletion
