= Camp Verde, Arizona =

Town in Yavapai County, Arizona

- Town
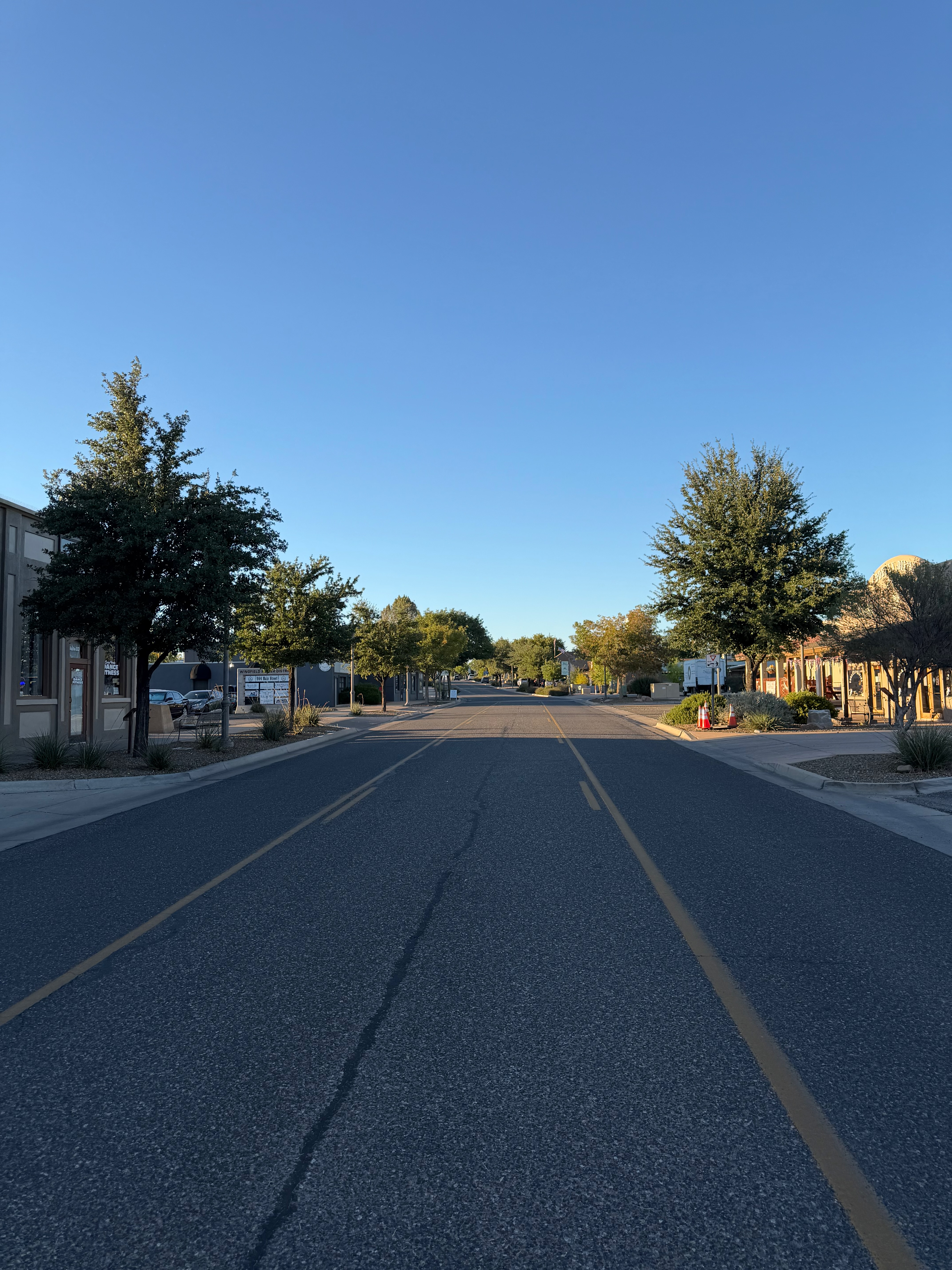
- Looking north along South Main Street

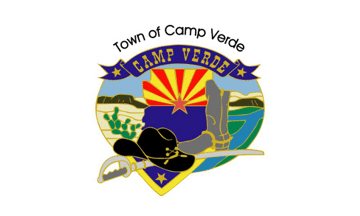
- Flag

- Location of Camp Verde in Yavapai County, Arizona

- Location in the United States Camp Verde, Arizona (the United States)
- Coordinates: 34°34′08″N 111°51′22″W
- Country: United States
- State: Arizona
- County: Yavapai

Government
  - Type: Council-manager
  - Mayor: Marie Moore

Area
  - Total: 42.36 sq mi (109.70 km^{2})
  - Land: 42.35 sq mi (109.68 km^{2})
  - Water: 0.012 sq mi (0.03 km^{2})
- Elevation: 3,094 ft (943 m)

Population (2020)
  - Total: 12,147
  - Density: 286.8/sq mi (110.75/km^{2})
- Time zone: UTC-7 (MST)
- ZIP code: 86322
- Area code: 928
- FIPS code: 04-09690
- GNIS feature ID: 2413154
- Website: Town of Camp Verde

Camp Verde (Yavapai: ʼMatthi:wa; Western Apache: Gambúdih) is a town in Yavapai County, Arizona, United States. As of the 2020 census, Camp Verde had a population of 12,147.

Every summer, the downtown area of Camp Verde is the site of the annual Corn Fest; held each year on the third Saturday in July, the popular event is sponsored and organized by local growers, Hauser and Hauser Farms. Other annual local events include the Pecan, Wine and Antiques Festival (February), the Crawdad Festival (June) and Fort Verde Days (October).

== Geography ==
The 42.6 sq mi (110 km^{2}) town is bisected by I-17, extending 8 miles (13 km) to the west and 10 miles (16 km) to the east of the interstate. Arizona State Route (SR) 260 connects Camp Verde with Payson to the east and Cottonwood to the west. Three freeway exits provide local access: Exits 285, 287, and 289. The town's historic downtown is approximately 1 mile (1.6 km) from I-17 and contains a grocery store, physician facilities, shopping, dining, historical museum, Fort Verde State Historic Park, chamber of commerce/visitor center and town offices. Camp Verde is located at 34°34′0″N 111°51′22″W (34.5667, -111.8562).

According to the United States Census Bureau, the town has a total area of 42.6 square miles (110 km^{2}), of which 42.6 square miles (110 km^{2}) is land and 0.02% is water. Camp Verde is in the Verde River valley. To the southwest lie the Black Hills mountain range. Camp Verde is surrounded by Prescott National Forest. The Mogollon Rim is just north of the town and forms the southwestern edge of the large, geologically ancient Colorado Plateau.

=== Climate ===
Camp Verde has a cold semi-arid climate (Köppen: BSk) with cool winters and very hot summers.

Climate data for Montezuma Castle National Monument, Arizona, 1991–2020 normals, extremes 1938–present
Month	Jan	Feb	Mar	Apr	May	Jun	Jul	Aug	Sep	Oct	Nov	Dec	Year
Record high °F (°C)	82 (28)	89 (32)	96 (36)	99 (37)	109 (43)	117 (47)	117 (47)	118 (48)	111 (44)	104 (40)	90 (32)	78 (26)	118 (48)
Mean maximum °F (°C)	72.0 (22.2)	77.1 (25.1)	85.2 (29.6)	93.2 (34.0)	100.3 (37.9)	108.1 (42.3)	110.5 (43.6)	108.0 (42.2)	102.6 (39.2)	94.8 (34.9)	82.5 (28.1)	71.0 (21.7)	111.6 (44.2)
Mean daily maximum °F (°C)	60.5 (15.8)	64.9 (18.3)	72.0 (22.2)	79.0 (26.1)	87.6 (30.9)	98.1 (36.7)	100.8 (38.2)	98.5 (36.9)	93.0 (33.9)	82.3 (27.9)	69.3 (20.7)	58.6 (14.8)	80.4 (26.9)
Daily mean °F (°C)	43.2 (6.2)	47.1 (8.4)	53.4 (11.9)	59.5 (15.3)	67.5 (19.7)	76.2 (24.6)	82.4 (28.0)	80.7 (27.1)	74.0 (23.3)	62.5 (16.9)	50.4 (10.2)	41.8 (5.4)	61.6 (16.4)
Mean daily minimum °F (°C)	25.9 (−3.4)	29.3 (−1.5)	34.9 (1.6)	40.0 (4.4)	47.3 (8.5)	54.4 (12.4)	64.0 (17.8)	62.8 (17.1)	55.0 (12.8)	42.6 (5.9)	31.5 (−0.3)	25.1 (−3.8)	42.7 (5.9)
Mean minimum °F (°C)	17.2 (−8.2)	20.3 (−6.5)	25.5 (−3.6)	30.3 (−0.9)	36.9 (2.7)	44.2 (6.8)	54.5 (12.5)	54.1 (12.3)	44.7 (7.1)	32.1 (0.1)	20.8 (−6.2)	16.5 (−8.6)	14.3 (−9.8)
Record low °F (°C)	−1 (−18)	4 (−16)	12 (−11)	16 (−9)	24 (−4)	36 (2)	45 (7)	39 (4)	31 (−1)	19 (−7)	8 (−13)	4 (−16)	−1 (−18)
Average precipitation inches (mm)	1.36 (35)	1.28 (33)	1.15 (29)	0.49 (12)	0.40 (10)	0.19 (4.8)	1.52 (39)	2.13 (54)	1.49 (38)	0.95 (24)	0.71 (18)	1.50 (38)	13.17 (335)
Average precipitation days (≥ 0.01 inch)	4.9	4.8	4.3	2.6	2.3	1.0	6.7	7.6	4.4	3.4	3.1	4.4	49.5
Source: NOAA

== Demographics ==
Historical population
Census	Pop.	Note	%±
1960	285		—
1980	3,824		—
1990	6,243		63.3%
2000	9,451		51.4%
2010	10,873		15.0%
2020	12,147		11.7%
U.S. Decennial Census

Camp Verde's population was 285 in the 1960 census. By the 1980s, the population had grown to 3,824.

=== 2020 census ===
As of the 2020 census, Camp Verde had a population of 12,147. The median age was 47.5 years. 20.3% of residents were under the age of 18 and 26.2% of residents were 65 years of age or older. For every 100 females there were 100.5 males, and for every 100 females age 18 and over there were 99.2 males age 18 and over.

47.4% of residents lived in urban areas, while 52.6% lived in rural areas.

There were 4,683 households in Camp Verde, of which 25.9% had children under the age of 18 living in them. Of all households, 45.6% were married-couple households, 19.3% were households with a male householder and no spouse or partner present and 27.2% were households with a female householder and no spouse or partner present. About 27.4% of all households were made up of individuals and 15.2% had someone living alone who was 65 years of age or older.

There were 5,199 housing units, of which 9.9% were vacant. The homeowner vacancy rate was 1.5% and the rental vacancy rate was 6.4%.

Racial composition as of the 2020 census
Race	Number	Percent
White	8,887	73.2%
Black or African American	74	0.6%
American Indian and Alaska Native	1,167	9.6%
Asian	74	0.6%
Native Hawaiian and Other Pacific Islander	13	0.1%
Some other race	830	6.8%
Two or more races	1,102	9.1%
Hispanic or Latino (of any race)	1,986	16.3%

=== 2000 census ===
As of the 2000 census, there were 9,451 people, 2,611 households and 2,538 families residing in the town. The population density was 222.0 inhabitants per square mile (85.7/km^{2}). There were 3,969 housing units at an average density of 93.2 per square mile (36.0/km^{2}). The racial makeup of the town was 85.1% White, 0.4% Black or African American, 7.3% Native American, 0.2% Asian, 0.1% Pacific Islander, 4.7% from other races and 2.2% from two or more races. 10.9% of the population were Hispanic or Latino of any race.

There were 2,611 households, out of which 27.4% had children under the age of 18 living with them, 55.9% were married couples living together, 9.8% had a female householder with no husband present and 29.7% were non-families. 24.3% of all households were made up of individuals, and 11.8% had someone living alone who was 65 years of age or older. The average household size was 2.52 and the average family size was 2.97.

In the town, the population was spread out, with 24.0% under the age of 18, 7.2% from 18 to 24, 23.0% from 25 to 44, 25.3% from 45 to 64 and 20.5% who were 65 years of age or older. The median age was 42 years. For every 100 females, there were 101.5 males. For every 100 females age 18 and over, there were 100.2 males.

The median income for a household in the town was $31,868, and the median income for a family was $37,049. Males had a median income of $30,104 versus $20,306 for females. The per capita income for the town was $15,072. About 9.5% of families and 14.0% of the population were below the poverty line, including 21.2% of those under age 18 and 6.1% of those age 65 or over.

== Tourism ==
Tourist attractions include the nearby Montezuma Castle National Monument located in Verde Valley. In the town is Fort Verde State Historic Park, Verde Valley Archaeology Center and the Out of Africa Wildlife Park. The Cliff Castle Casino, operated by the Yavapai-Apache Nation, is an important gambling destination for north and central Arizona. Fort Verde State Historic Park is located in Camp Verde's Historic Downtown, approximately 1 mile (1.6 km) from each of the three Camp Verde exits.

== Education ==
Camp Verde Unified School District serves the community.

== Transportation ==
Greyhound Lines serves Camp Verde on its Phoenix–Las Vegas and Los Angeles–New York routes. Groome Transportation serves Camp Verde on its Phoenix–Sedona and Phoenix–Flagstaff routes.

The Montezuma Heights neighborhood has an airpark.

== Historic places ==
Historic properties and structures of Camp Verde
(NRHP = National Register of Historic Places)
(CVHS=Verde Camp Verde Historical Society-listed)
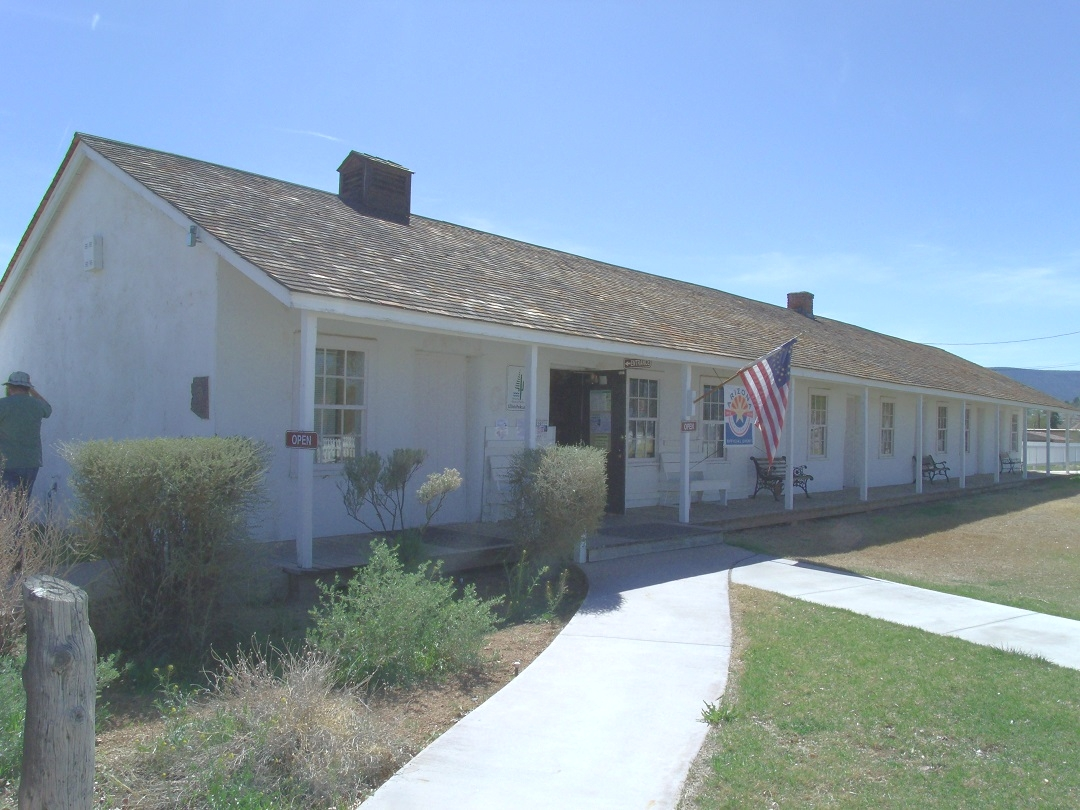
The main Administration Building of Fort Verde was built in 1871 and is located at 125 E. Hollamon St. It contained the main offices from which the decisions as to the operations of the fort were made. It now houses the Visitor Center of the Fort Verde Museum and contains exhibits, period artifacts from military life, and history on the Indian Scouts and Indian Wars era. It is listed in the National Register of Historic Places, reference #71000120.

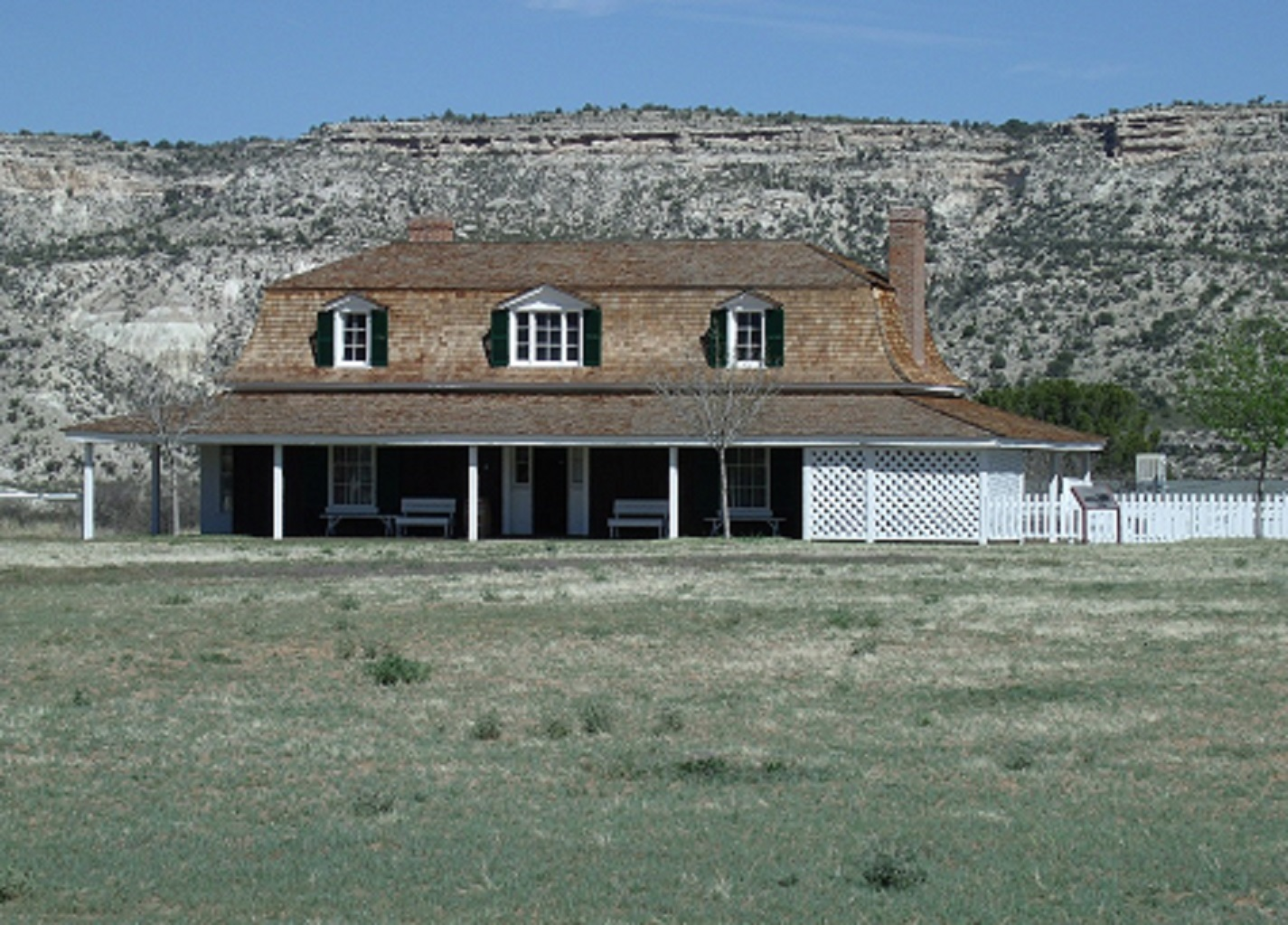
The historic Commanding Officer Quarters in Fort Verde was built in 1871 and is in the grounds of the Fort Verde Museum located at 125 E. Hollamon St.

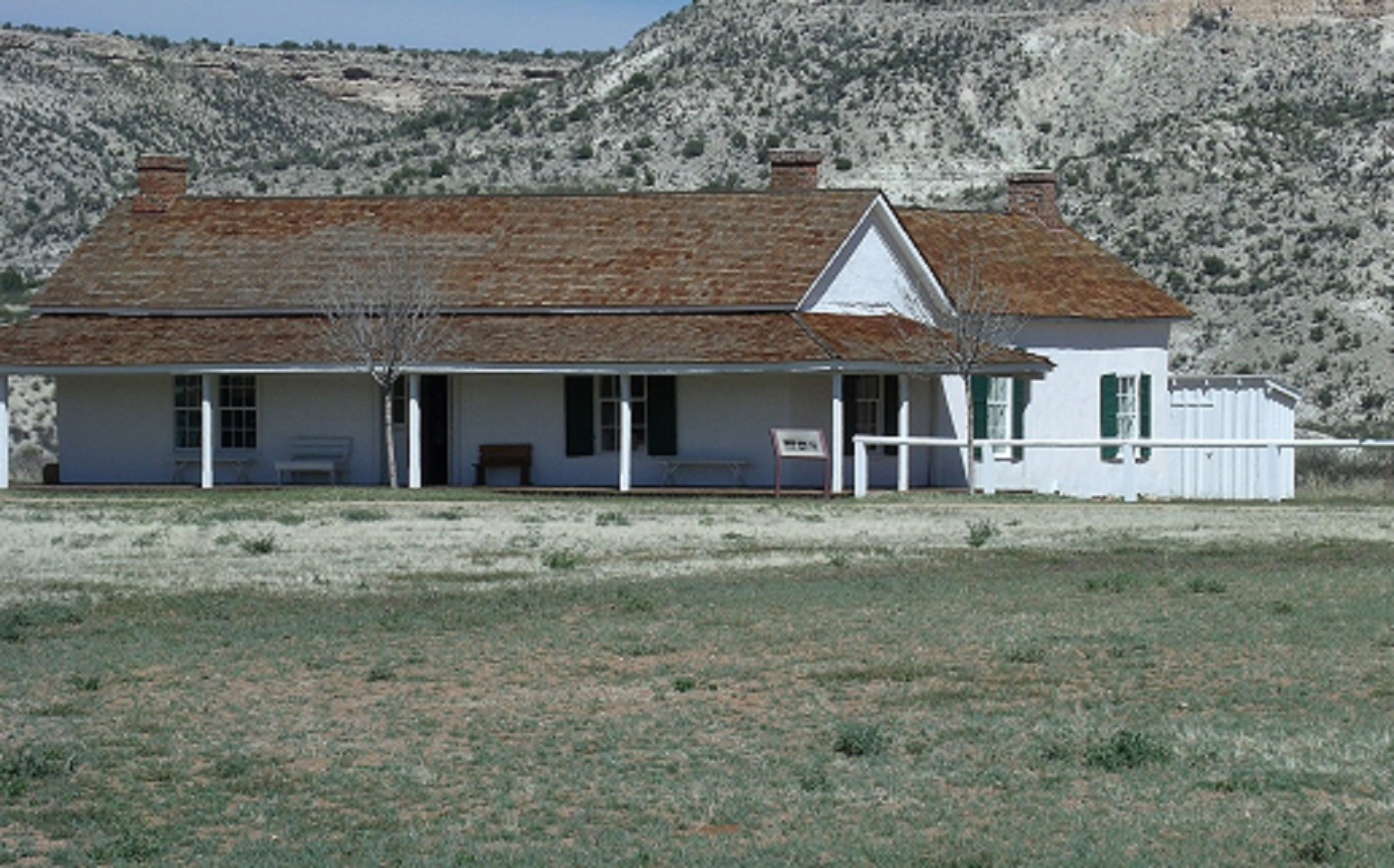
The historic Bachelor Officers’ Quarters in Fort Verde was built in 1871.

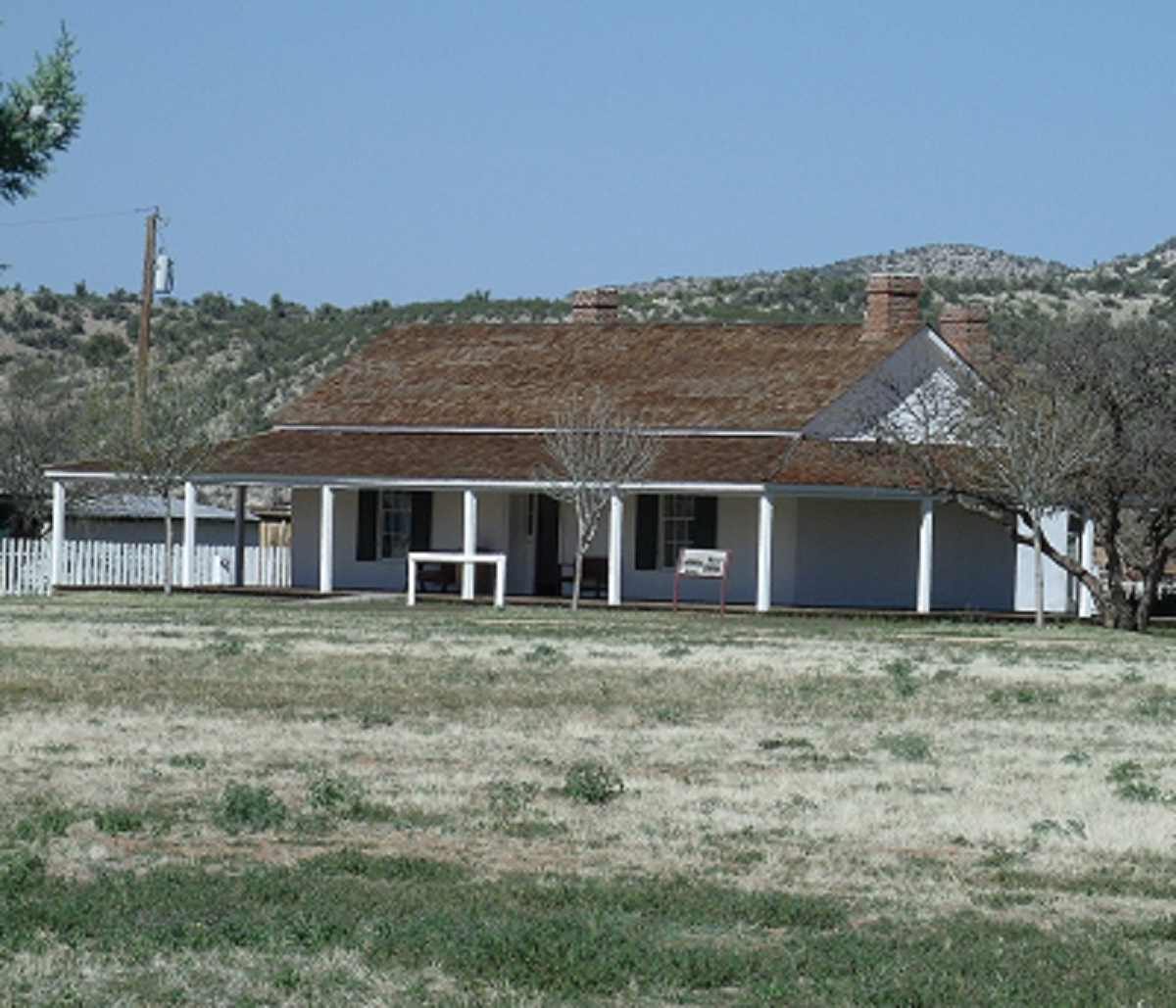
The historic Doctor’s & Surgeons Quarters in Fort Verde was built in 1871.

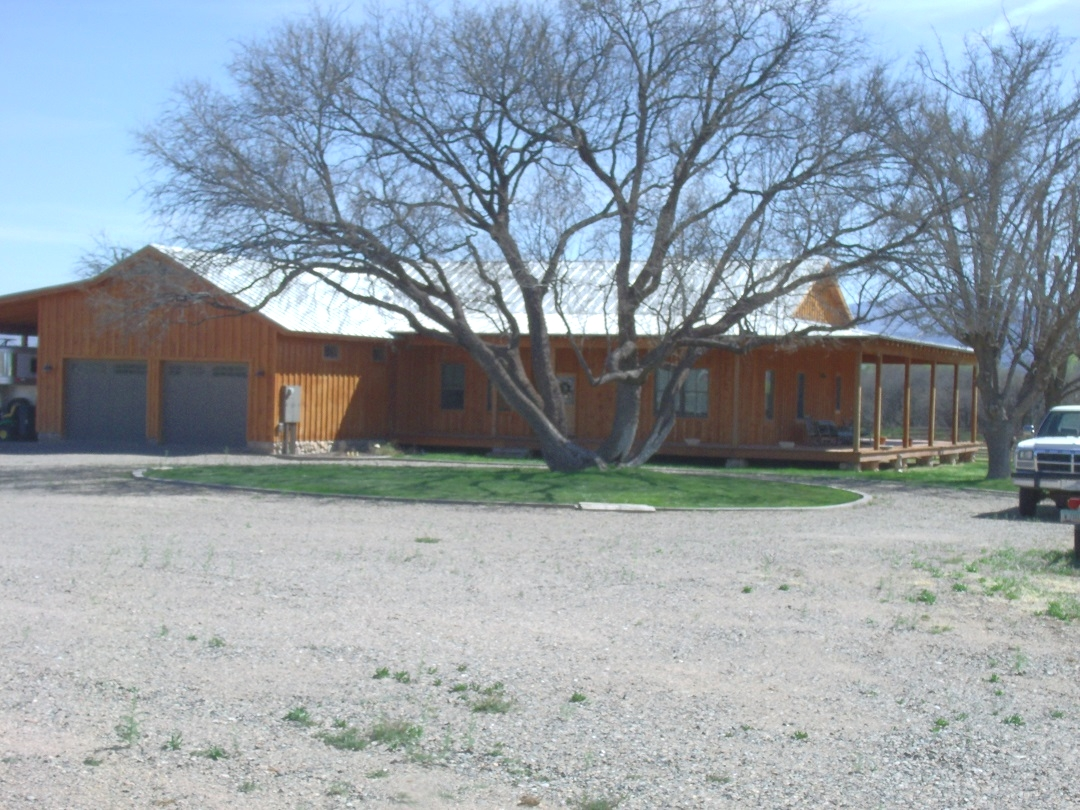
The Wingfield, Hank and Myrtle, Homestead, a.k.a." Crooked "H" Ranch House", was built in 1917 and is located at 806 E. Quaterhorse Ln. It was listed in the National Register of Historic Places in 1999, reference #99000857.

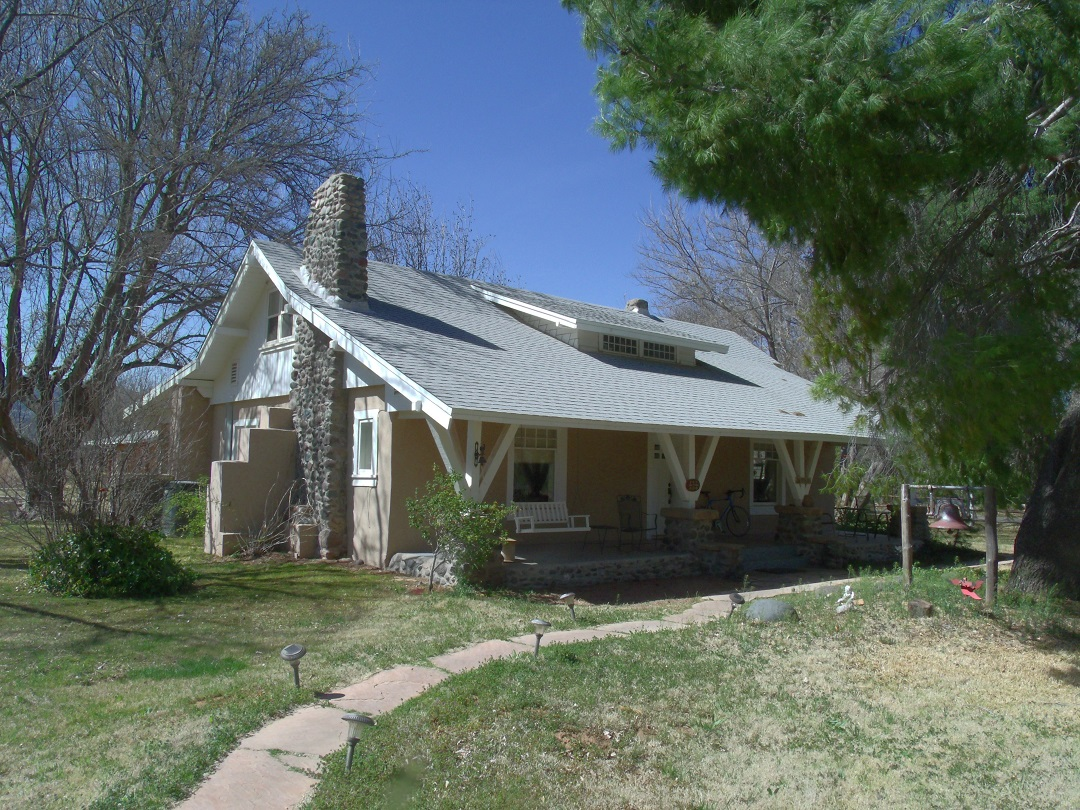
The Don Bell House was built in 1917 and is located at 2530 Anupaya Ln. It was listed in the National Register of Historic Places in 2004, reference #04000513

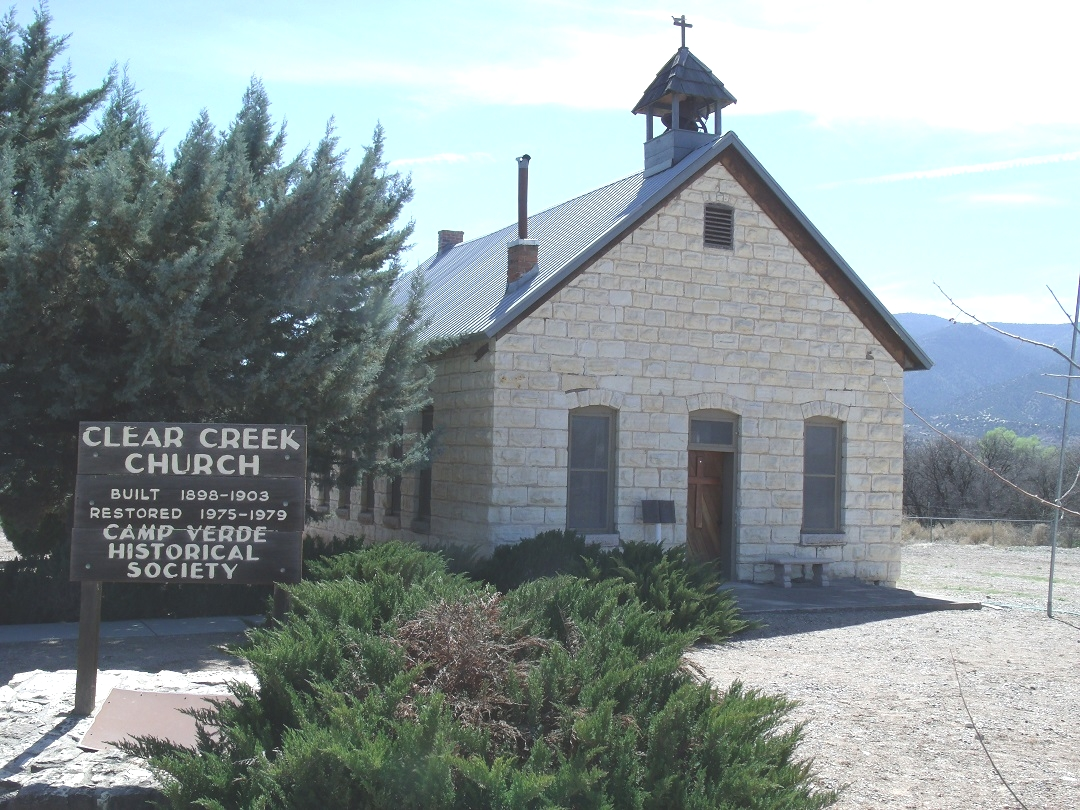
The Clear Creek Church was built in 1898 and is located on Clear Creek Road 3.5 mi. SE of Camp Verde. The builders placed in the cornerstone of the building a bible and a $5 gold piece (which was chiseled away in the 1920s). It was Camp Verde’s only church until 1913, when it was transformed into the city’s one-room schoolhouse. In 1946, the church was abandoned. Today Clear Creek Church is looked after by the Camp Verde Historical Society. It was listed in the National Register of Historic Places on August 6, 1975, reference #75000362.

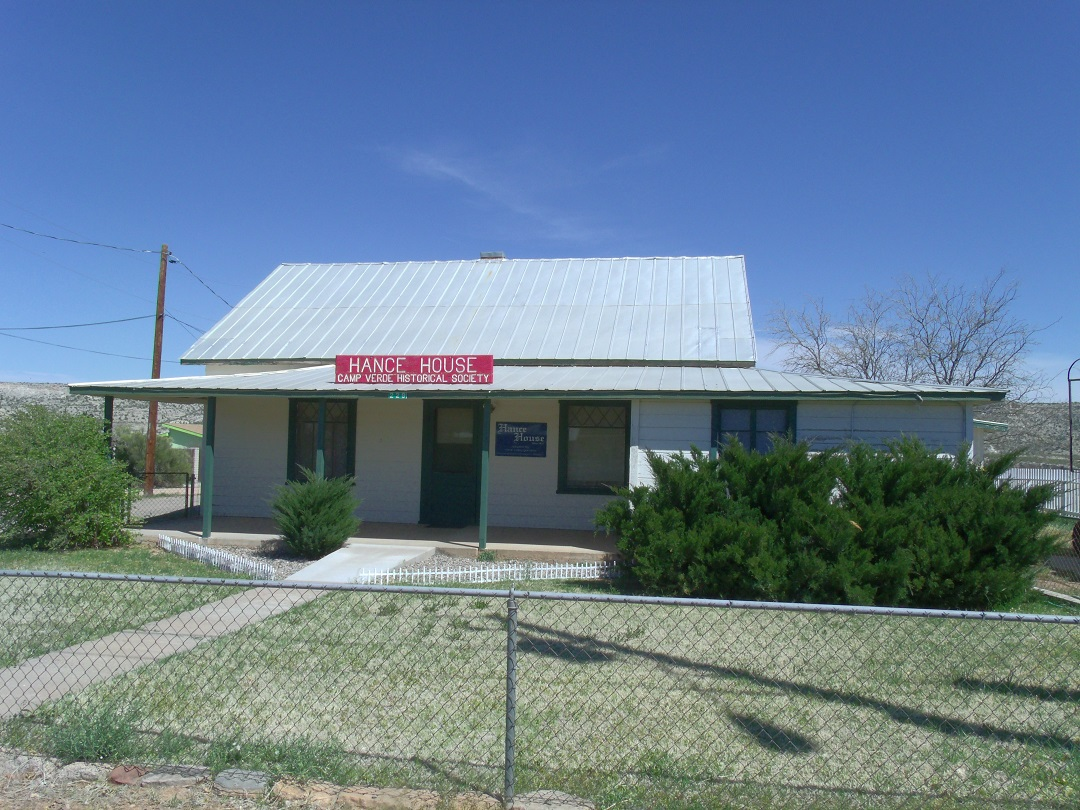
The George Hance House was built in 1916 and is located at 229 Coppinger Street. George Hance was a veteran of the American Civil War who served as Camp Verdes first postmaster. For almost 30 years, George Hance served as the unincorporated community's unofficial mayor. Hance was also a Justice of the Peace, notary public and cattleman. The house is now a museum and is owned by the Camp Verde Historical Society. It is located in the Fort Verde District, which was added to the National Register of Historic Places in 1971, reference #71000120.
