= 0A =

0A (zero A) or 0-A may refer to:

- 0x0A, hexadecimal octet corresponding to the ASCII line feed control character
- 0-ary (or nullary or point-free), when a function or operation takes zero operands; see Arity
- 0-age main sequence, or ZAMS, a main sequence stage in astronomy's Hertzsprung–Russell diagram
- 0 allomorph, also null allomorph, a special kind of allomorph in morphology which has the form of a null morpheme
- 0 address arithmetic, zero address arithmetic, a computer architecture feature where assignment to a physical address space is deferred until programming statement execution time
- 0 air, or zero air, an air purifier result that contains less than 0.1 ppm total hydrocarbons

== See also ==
- A0 (disambiguation)
