= Out of Africa Wildlife Park =

Zoo in Camp Verde, Arizona, US

Coordinates: 34.612°N 111.924°W

- Interactive map of Out of Africa Wildlife Park
- Date opened: 2005
- Location: Camp Verde, Arizona
- Major exhibits: African Bush Safari, Tiger Splash, Predator Feed Experience, Giant Snake Show, Predator Zip Line
- Website: Official website

Out of Africa Wildlife Park is a wildlife park and zoo in Camp Verde, Arizona. It was opened to the public in 2005. Compared to traditional zoos, the park features spacious habitats where exotic animals from around the world are able to roam freely, allowing for a more naturalistic view of wildlife.

== History ==
The park was originally founded in 1988 by Dean and Prayeri Harrison with the mission of bringing people, animals, and nature together in a natural setting. Initially located in Fountain Hills, Arizona, the park moved to its current location in Camp Verde in 2005 to accommodate its growing collection of animals and visitors.

In April 2024, an orphaned mountain lion cub was transferred to the park from the Adobe Mountain Wildlife Facility. This rescue was facilitated by the Tohono Oʼodham Nation and the Arizona Game and Fish Department, as reintroduction into the wild was not viable due to the cub's young age and lack of survival skills.

== Conservation ==
The park collaborates with organizations such as the Arizona Game and Fish Department and the Katie Adamson Conservation Fund to support wildlife rescue and conservation initiatives.

== Gallery ==
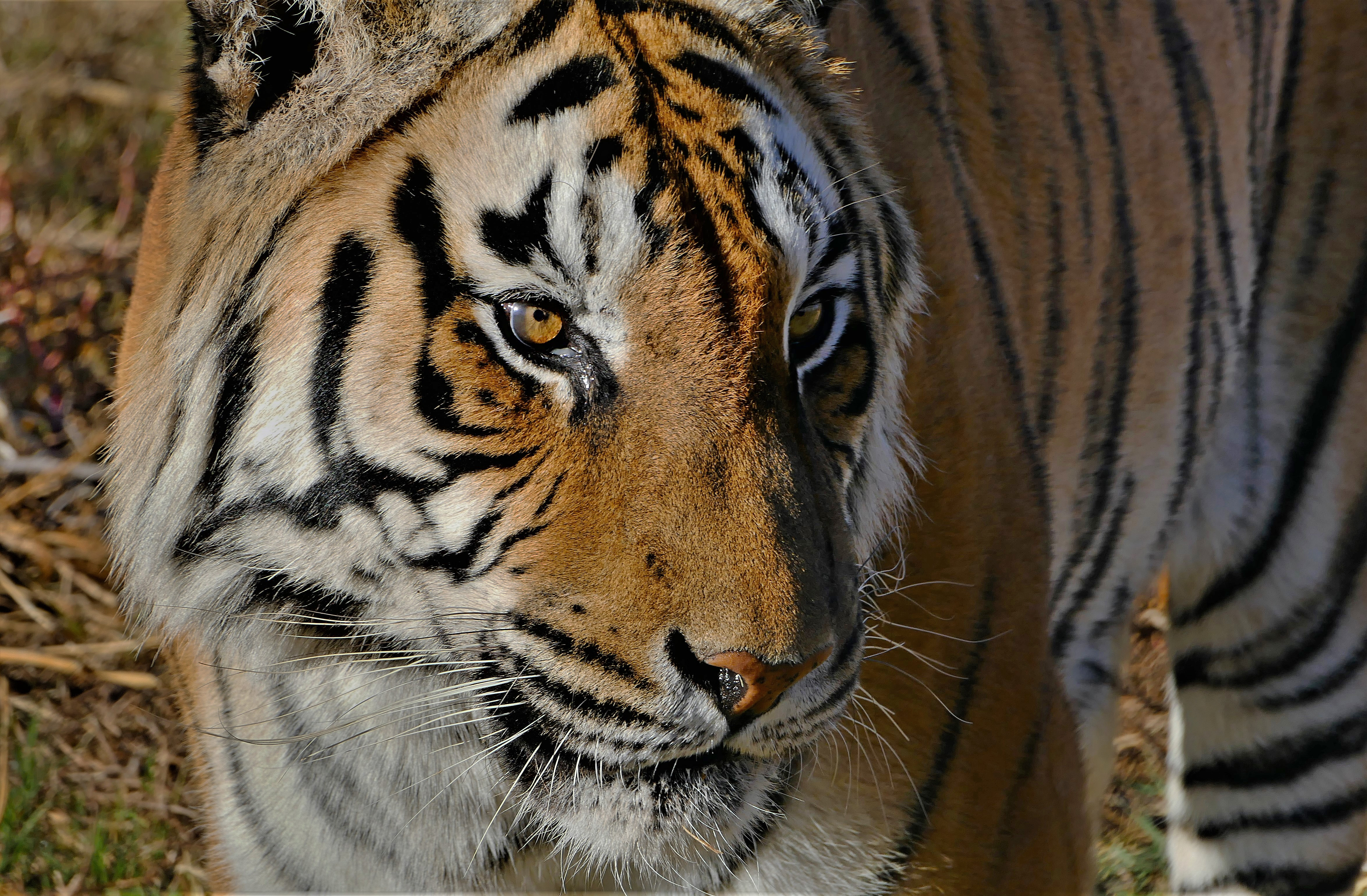
Tiger

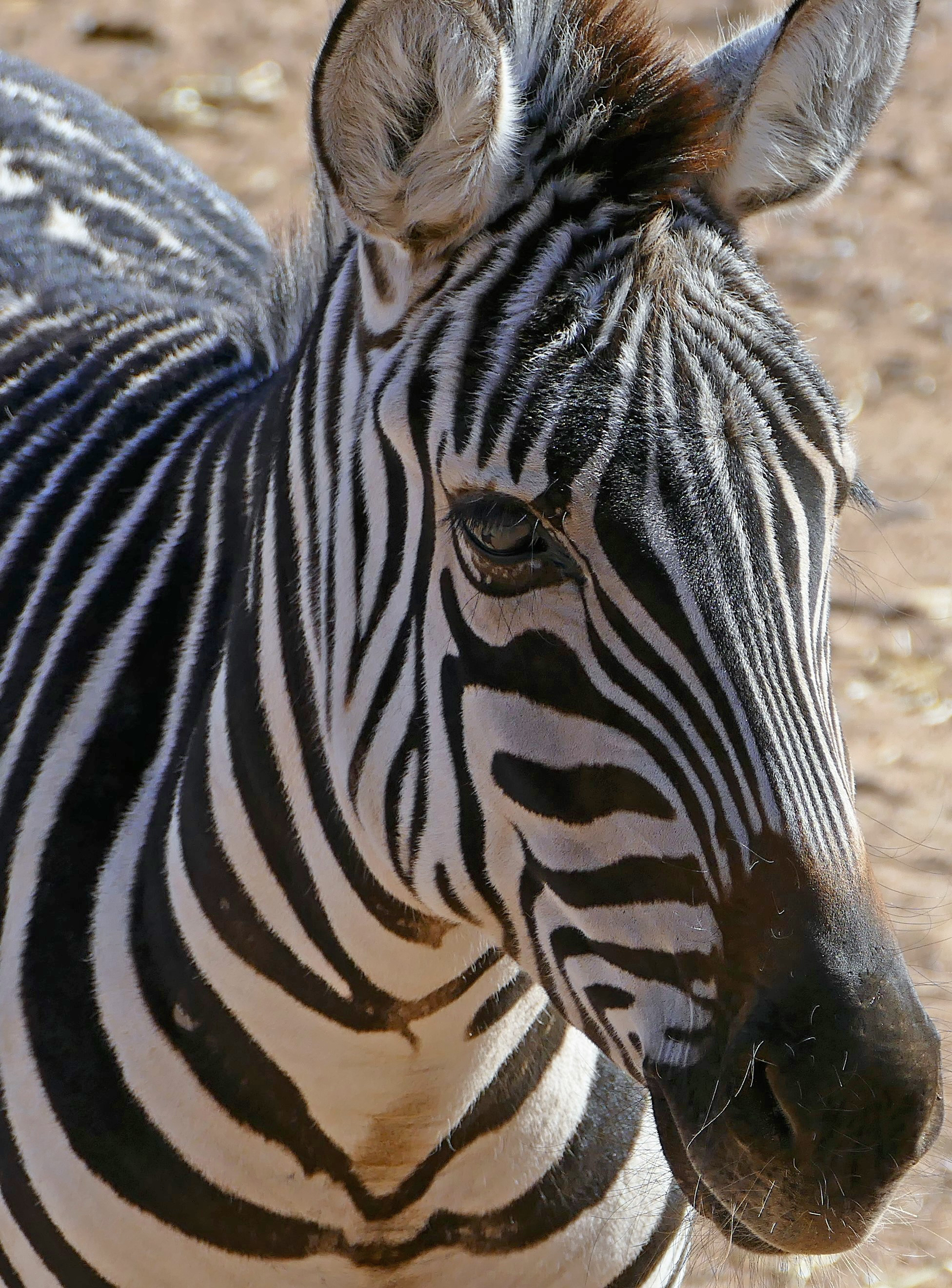
Zebra

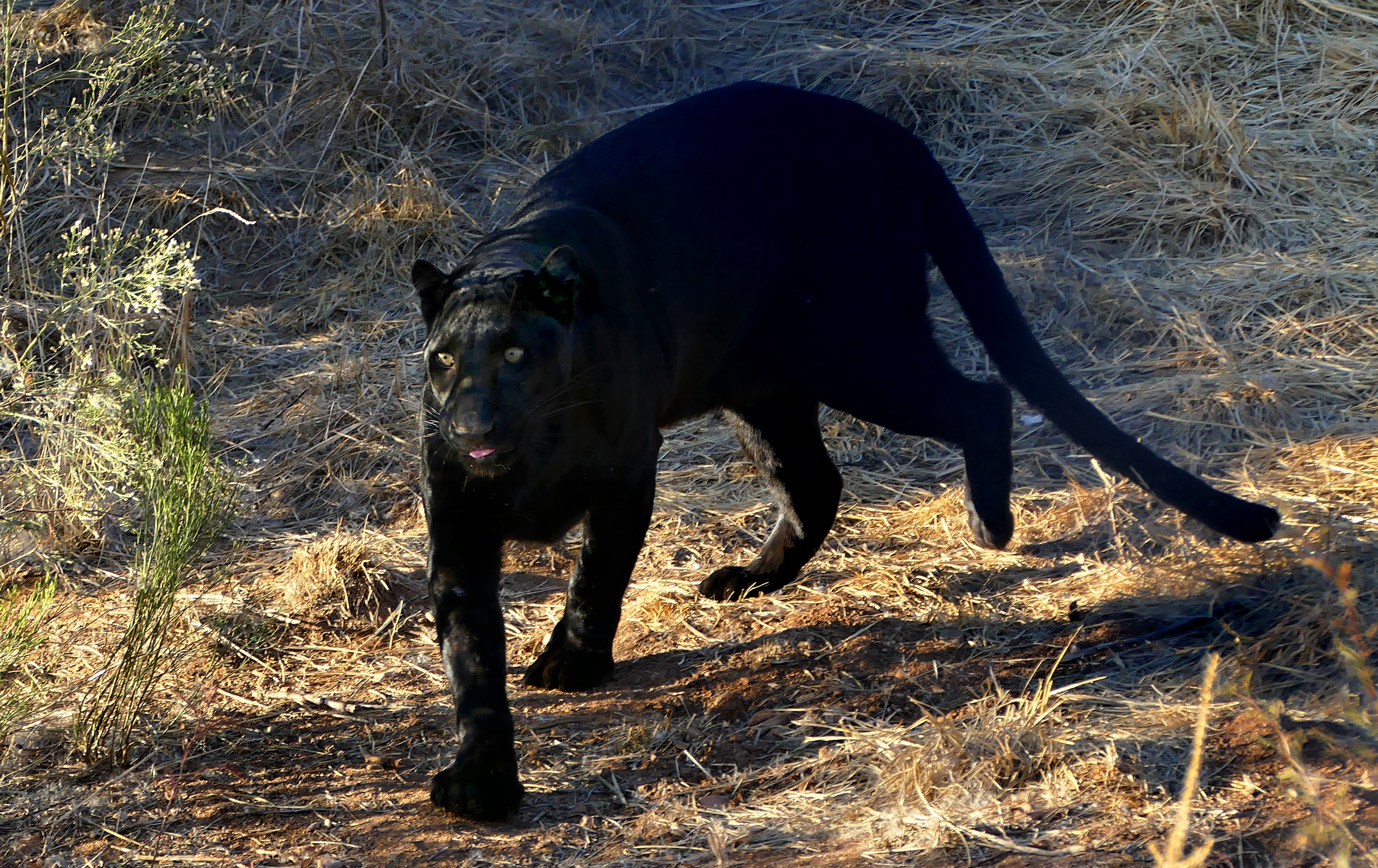
Black panther

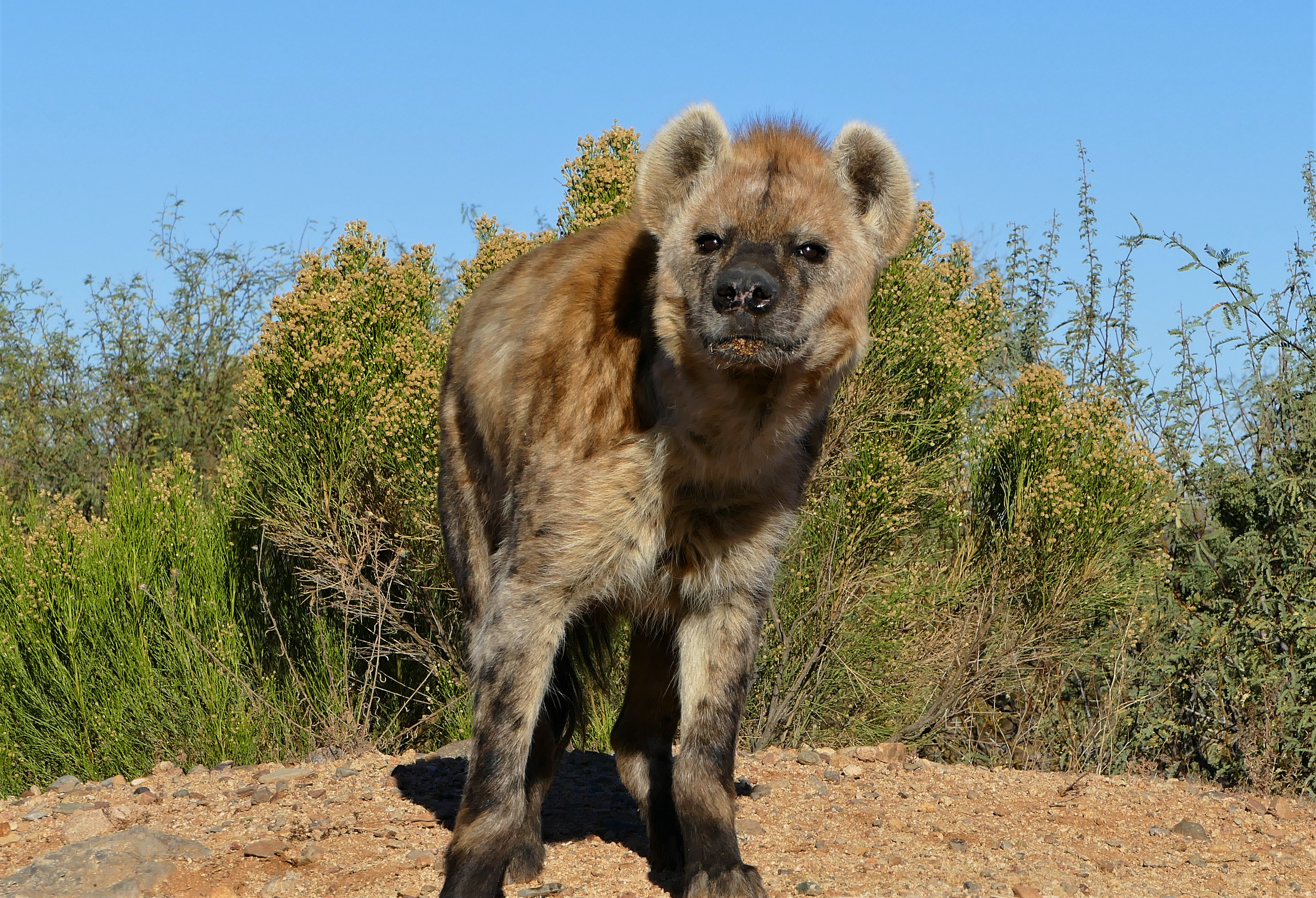
Hyena

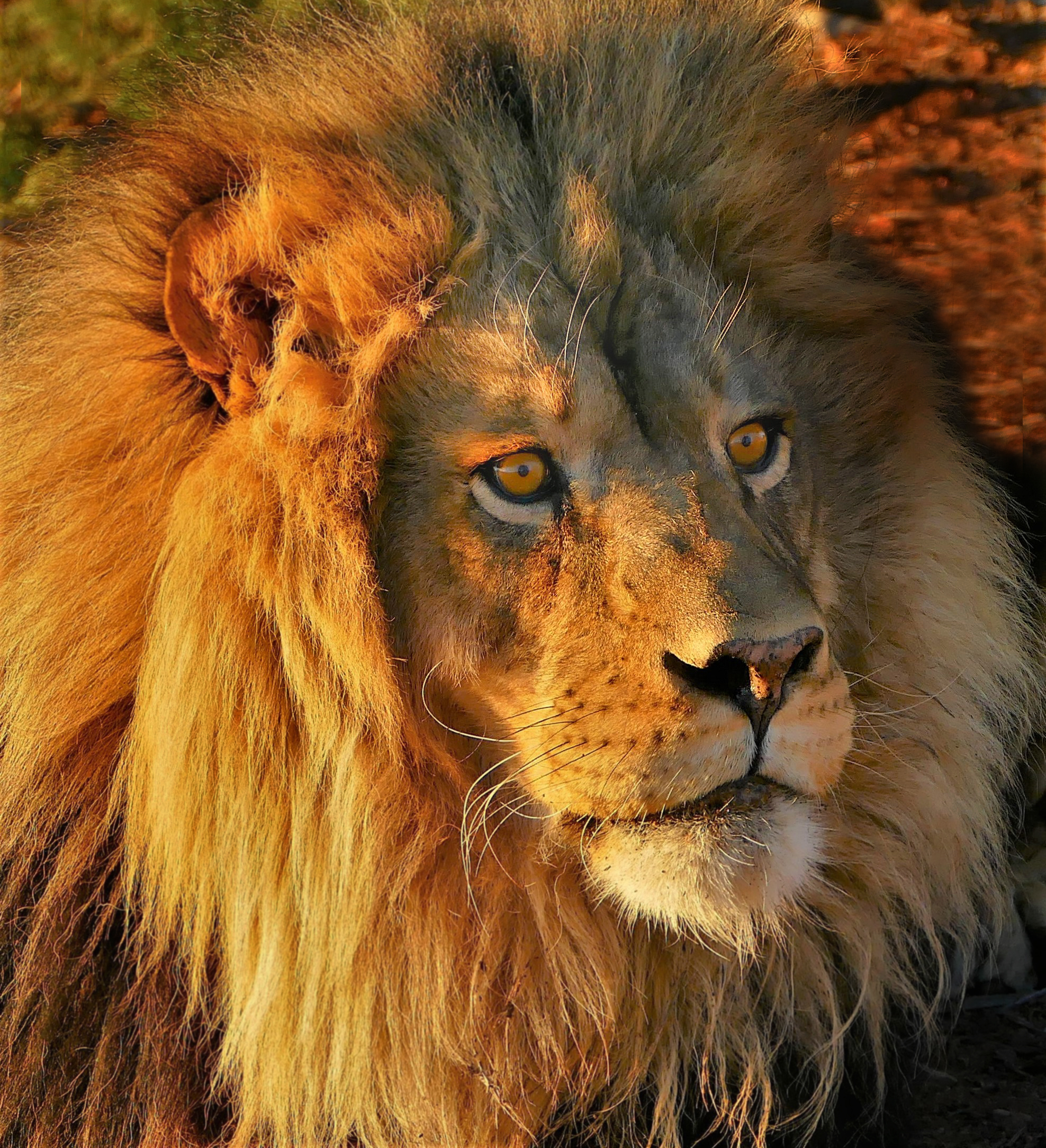
Lion
