= A-0 Geyser =

Geyser in Yellowstone National Park, US

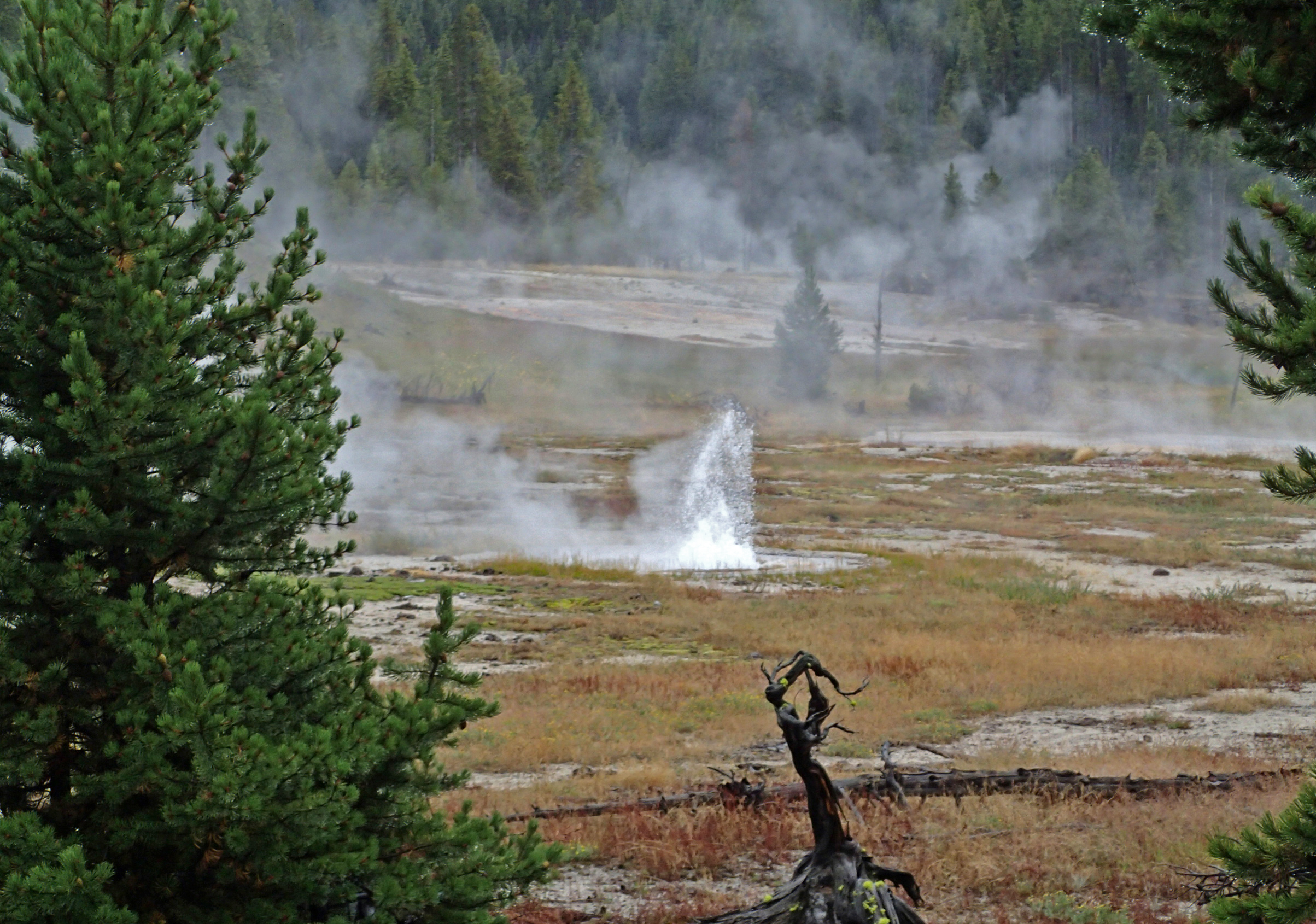
- A-0 geyser erupting
- Interactive map of A-0 Geyser
- Location: Lower Geyser Basin, Yellowstone National Park, Teton County, Wyoming
- Coordinates: 44°32′35″N 110°47′47″W
- Type: Fountain geyser
- Eruption height: 5 feet (1.5 m)
- Frequency: usually 20-26 minutes
- Duration: 40 seconds
- Temperature: 181 °F (83 °C)

A-0 Geyser is a geyser in the Lower Geyser Basin of Yellowstone National Park in the United States.

A-0 Geyser is part of the White Creek Group which includes Spindle Geyser and Botryoidal Spring. It can be identified by its shallow, round basin with a round vent in the middle found 100 feet (30 m) southeast of the Surprise Pool parking area.

It erupts for a duration of about 30 to 40 seconds with intervals of 20 to 26 minutes between eruptions. The fountain reaches a height of 5 to 10 feet (1.5 to 3.0 m).

The name A-0 is an unofficial name based on the proximity of this geyser to the dormant A-1 and A-2 geysers.

The RCN location of this geyser has been unintentionally switched with Dilemma Geyser, elsewhere in the Lower Geyser Basin.
