= Ethan Haas Was Right =

Marketing campaign

Ethan Haas Was Right (EHWR) was a viral marketing campaign developed by Mind Storm Labs to promote its role-playing game: Alpha Omega: The Beginning and The End. It involved a storyline of an apocalypse taking place in the near future, the band of survivors, and the perpetrators. The game received publicity online after it was erroneously connected with the J. J. Abrams film Cloverfield.

The game consisted of a series of Flash puzzles, all concerning a giant sphere that changed shape as each puzzle was solved. Behind the sphere, a city skyline at night was visible. As the player completed the puzzles, the image progressively changed to that of a destroyed city.

Over the main screen, stars were visible, and more appeared as the puzzles progressed. The leftmost and rightmost star were available from the beginning. The left star, which glowed blue, would activate one's mail program with the address filled in; sending an email to this address originally resulted in an automated reply giving several tips on how to solve the puzzles, but in mid-July 2007 this was changed to a more cryptic message. The right star, when hovered over, would display 26 symbols that corresponded to the alphabet and would be required in two of the puzzles. Solving puzzles would also treat visitors to videos that were somewhat damaged and difficult to comprehend.

== Design ==
The online marketing strategy was designed by Orlando-based Mind Storm Labs using characters and story borrowed from their role-playing game Alpha Omega: The Beginning and The End. The website for Ethan Haas Was Right was developed by the Los Angeles-based interactive shop RED Interactive Agency.

== Characters ==
There are several characters who are assumed, for the purposes of the game, to be real people. Established characters are as follows.

=== Ethan Haas ===
A man who once foretold the coming destruction of the world; he had visions and was thought of as a prophet who recorded what he saw. He is now presumed to be long dead. No current significance has been attached to his name.

According to the official Alpha Omega game website, Haas was a 19th-century Parisian author, virtually unknown to the public. His book, The Wheel and Other Stories, was dismissed as fiction. He vanished after the book's publication. But as the centuries progressed, the public accepted Haas as a prophet.

Coincidentally and completely unrelated, Ethan Haas is also the name of the character first seen in The Class, a CBS sitcom starring Lizzy Caplan, who was in Cloverfield.

=== Van Mantra ===
Mantra, the only character so far that players have been able to actually see, is a student of Haas's teachings; he apparently found the writings of Haas, and began to believe them as he saw predictions come true.

In the videos, Mantra appears in a dark setting, so it is difficult to make out much of his appearance or surroundings. Adding to the mystery surrounding him, Mantra's name may be a pseudonym.

Mantra is the one who established the website, creating it as a test for those seeking to learn of Haas' prophecies, and leaving video recordings for those who completed the puzzles. In organizing the website, however, Mantra appears to be organizing a resistance/survivor's group, after most of the known world meets its end.

He has also sent out emails to those who used an address found on the website asking for help; after a certain amount of time, personalized help-mails stopped, and only an automatic response was sent, with a generic list of clues. Personalized emails continued intermittently, for instance in response to an inquiry about a purported Ethan Haas profile on My Space, which Mantra dismissed.

=== The Mezin ===
The Mezin is a group of some kind, the details of which are not yet known. They are staunchly opposed to the teachings of Haas, and to the activities of Van Mantra, to the point where they hacked the outgoing message on Van Mantra's voice mail, prompting Van Mantra to go even deeper underground. It has recently been alluded that the Mezin may have captured Van Mantra.

=== Triton Enterprises ===
Triton Enterprises is a company reported to be run by the Mezin and is connected to the EHWR website. This becomes evident in the properties of the PDF file found on the Triton Enterprises website. The facility is currently on lockdown after some kind of crisis.

==== Emails ====
From Triton Enterprises entitled "[Security Protocol T1987E] Temporary Security Measures":

Due to a recent breach in security at our facility in Washington State, Triton Enterprises has been required to engage a DoD level 4 security lock down.
This security protocol is a requirement for all Department of Defense contractors when a minor security violation has been detected.
Unfortunately, due to the requirements of the lock down we must postpone all scheduled tours of our facility.
Please be patient as we clear up this minor problem. We apologize if this lock down impacts any orders you may have with us.
Once we are back online, we will continue towards our goal of building the future one vision at a time.
If you need more information, please contact me at anytime.
Kellie Graham

Personalized emails are also reported to have been received from Triton regarding requests for interviews and employment.

=== Kellie Graham ===
Kellie Graham is an employee of Triton Enterprises, and if someone emails the Triton Enterprises information email, they will receive an automatic email from the company signed by her. However, she also has her own company email, which when emailed sends out a plea for assistance as of August 1.

From Kellie Graham's company email entitled "Help us!":

Don't believe what Triton is telling you. I didn't write that security protocol notice.
Something has gone terribly wrong at the facility!! If you are receiving this message, please send help! There are several of us trapped on the lower D-ring testing platform. I had no idea what they were doing here, if I don't make it to the surface may God forgive me for any part I have played in this.
I should have listened to him, but I thought what he was talking about was nonsense, now I'm afraid he may be right....

The "him" mentioned in the email may be Van Mantra. If she is working for a company owned by the Mezin, it is likely she would believe that he was insane for talking about the prophecies of Ethan Haas. However, Kellie seems to have come to believe him based on this and the hidden message in the PDF file on the Triton website.

Now, if you email her, this is her response:

From Kellie Graham's company email entitled "The end is near":

This will be my last email to the outside world. We've been sealed in from the outside; I don't think help will get here in time. We were fools to think we could control nature; the things we created here are not natural. I can only hope the truth is revealed to the world before it's too late. Before something down here escapes to the world out there...
I should have listened to him, but I thought what he was talking about was nonsense, now I'm afraid he may be right....

== Puzzles ==
The text of an automated email from Mantra, also found in a hidden help section of ethanhaaswasright.com, offering the following message:

Share this message as guidance for how to navigate the 5 locks to the key code...
1) The first lock will test your memory. Follow the trail of light and sound, but be careful -- one wrong move will send you back to the beginning.
2) For the second lock, you may need to look to the stars. They will help you find HAAS who will lead your way.
3) The third lock will require you to extinguish all lights but one. Only with one light remaining will you be able to proceed. Americans can think like those peg games at Cracker Barrel.
4) The fourth lock will let you move all 4 pieces through the control of one. However, unless the three key pieces are simultaneously placed into position, you will not be granted access. (↑←↓↓←→↑→↑←←)
5) The fifth lock will be the toughest. Seek help again from the stars to reveal your key and the message that you must decode. The two working together will open the way.
Good luck.
Van

== Videos ==
Each video plays after the corresponding puzzle is solved, and can be paused, or stopped to go back to the main part of the site. The videos can be accessed again by clicking on the stars that appear after solving each puzzle.

The videos are also available on YouTube.

== Van's emails ==
The following email was recently sent to visitors seeking help through emailing Van at the Haas site:

I think I'm safe, for now. Wherever I go it isn't long before they find me.
It seems The Mezin are connected to every aspect of humanity, from culture and religion to our most advanced technology
I have to be more careful contacting all of you. When I began, I thought I could safely speak about his writings and perhaps save us all but now it seems I will have to find a more subtle way to share his visions.
If this is the first message, you have received from me do not give up hope! There are others that have gone before you, the way has been found, you only need to search, and you will find the answers you seek. We will all have a role to play. We are getting stronger; our voices will be heard!
I have more of Haas's writings, once I find a secure way to transmit them, I will leave you clues to find them.
The more I read the more I realize Haas was right...

Another email is sent when you email the address given on the website with "54312", which is the number flashed in the fourth video. The email reads:

Time is running out!
If this is the first message, you have received from me do not give up hope! There are others that have gone before you, the way has been found, you only need to search, and you will find the answers you seek. We will all have a role to play. We are getting stronger; our voices will be heard!
I have more of Haas's writings, I found a secure way to transmit them, but I cannot make it easy to find them. There are others who would destroy them if they could.
know the stars of Cassiopeia and you will know when you've reached your destination.
The more I read the more I realize Haas was right...
279fh7691

The number sequence "279fh7691" leads to one of the three letters.

== Divinus ==
Upon completing all five puzzles and watching all five videos, a sixth form of the sphere appears as a tablet with greenery growing around it in contrast to the destroyed city behind it. Across the top of the tablet is the word 'Divinus'. It has an input for Name and Email, with a submit button that says, 'Remind Me', citing the date of the 1st of August, referencing the fifth video which lists August 1 as an important date to meet back at the EHWR website. Presumably, entering one's email will prompt a reminder to revisit the site closer to the 1st, though the exact purpose of this is not yet known for sure.

In addition to the Divinus tablet, upon completing the puzzles, several other changes occur to the setting. There are now seven stars across the skyline — the leftmost blue star still gives access to the automated email with hints, while the rightmost still brings up the alternate alphabet. The other five show the five videos seen after completing each puzzle, with the first white star on the left accessing the first video, the second accessing the second, etc.

Finally, a panel appears on the right-hand side of the screen, with six panels, each bearing a reduced image of the sphere in its six forms. Clicking on a corresponding panel will take you to a puzzle or the Divinus tablet. This is for replay value only, and will not force you to complete all of the puzzles again to reach this point.

On August 2 the following message appears on the website:

The Time Has Come...

Ethan Haas' message has been heard by millions. The war is coming but now we are united and ready. Forces are aligning against us, ancient powers who have laid in wait for centuries waiting for a chance to plunge the world into ruin. But now is our chance - I have found a safe place where we can rally together to prepare for the coming storm. Now is the time to choose what role you will play.

Are you ready?

NO, I will need to hear the warnings first.

YES, show me what lies ahead for us all.

If NO is selected, it takes the reader to the 5 puzzles; if YES is chosen, the reader is redirected to the game's website.

== Cloverfield connection ==
Although they were incorrect in the end, people speculated that EHWR was connected to the Paramount-produced movie, Cloverfield. This claim was supported by the similar themes of the viral marketing campaign and the trailer; in addition, Paramount removed videos of the Cloverfield trailer, as well as videos concerning EHWR, suggesting that they had legal rights to both, which led players to believe the two were connected. However, this could have been because many Van Mantra videos were labeled as "Cloverfield Video" or "Ethan Haas-Cloverfield", making it probable that YouTube merely removed the videos due to them simply containing the term "Cloverfield" on the video page. In an e-mail to aintitcool.com (purportedly from Cloverfield producer J. J. Abrams), a connection between Cloverfield and Ethan Haas was denied. However, there were still a few outstanding similarities. Everyone who completed the puzzles on the Ethan Haas website and gave their email addresses received a message on January 18, 2008 (the release date of Cloverfield). The subject line read "The Revelations of Ethan Haas Has Begun 1-18-08", emphasizing the date, which was written in the same format that was used for the promotion of the film. Lizzy Caplan, the actress playing Marlena in the film, was also on the sitcom The Class, in which she had a romantic interest in a character named Ethan Haas.

== Alpha Omega: The Beginning and The End ==
On July 7, 2007, OMG WTF EHWR?! traced domain record information to an individual with connections to an RPG company called Mind Storm Labs. It was the first published evidence that Ethan Haas Was Right might be a promotion for that company's forthcoming role-playing game, Alpha Omega: The Beginning and The End.

Four days later, on July 11, 2007, Wraith, a former writer for the now-defunct Total Gamer News, unaware of any previous proof, presented further evidence (along with a photo comparison supporting his claim) that Ethan Haas indeed was a promotional website for the Mind Storm Labs game Alpha Omega: The Beginning and The End.

If all the puzzles at EthanHaasWasRight.com are finished, the reader can see that the city in the background is badly wrecked, and about an inch from the left of that, the reader can faintly see a similar image (including the tank) from the Alpha Omega site.

Although not conclusive evidence of a connection, the solution for puzzle #5 "The beginning is the end" appears to be a slight variation on the biblical Alpha and Omega "I am the Alpha and the Omega, the first and the last, the beginning and the end." (Revelation 22:13)

Also, the alphabet key that appears when you hover your mouse cursor over one of the stars has a complete set of 26 in-game symbols, but only the real-world "A" and "Z" shown below them; the 24 letters in between are only implied, not shown. A and Z are the first and last letters of the English alphabet, as alpha and omega are the first and last letters of the Greek alphabet.

As of August 2, this was confirmed as the website has changed linking to a screen asking the following:

The time has come...
Ethan Haas' message has been heard by millions. The war is coming but now we are united and ready. Forces are aligning against us, ancient powers who have laid in wait for centuries waiting for the chance to plunge this world into ruin. But now is our chance - I've found a safe place where we can rally together and prepare for the coming storm. Now is the time to choose what role you will play.
Are you ready?
No, I need to see and hear the warnings first.
Yes, show me what lies ahead for us all.

Clicking "No" takes you back to the original site with the puzzles. Clicking "Yes" takes you to the new official Alpha Omega website.

== News coverage ==
EHWR has seen coverage online as well as coverage in USA Today, Forbes Magazine and the LA Times. While most have been unable to provide definitively new information, they have largely served to spread notice of the viral marketing campaign to the Internet community at large, and were the ones to first point out the viral marketing campaign to prospective players. All of the online coverage has been related to a supposed link between EHWR and J. J. Abrams' Cloverfield.

- Cinematical lists EHWR as viral marketing for the untitled J. J. Abrams movie, and suggests that Ethan Haas will be a main character in said movie.
- Cinemablend and RopeOfSilicon.com similarly report a connection between the two.
- Ain't It Cool News, however, reports that there is no such connection, from an email from J. J. Abrams.
- iF Magazine, IGN, Film.com, Chud.com, and New York Entertainment have all reported on EHWR and Cloverfield together.
- PopMatters, interviewed Alpha Omega creators David Carter & Earl Fischl and Mind Storm Labs President Tom McLaughlin in June 2008. They discussed the creation of the Alpha Omega RPG and their viral marketing campaign, Ethan Haas Was Right.

== Source code ==
Source code within EthanHaasWasRight.com reveals the following:

..war came, no longer from the elemental nor from the star's rain of fire. The world was again remade, and the glow was as the coming of the sun upon the Earth. The children of the gods were again too few, scattered and divided and among them walked the ancients and those whose thoughts were not as to the towers and the marvels, but to the End and the destruction of the Earth and to the fires from which nothing could escape.

This can also be seen when the website is loaded. The text is quickly flashed on the screen followed by the loading of the puzzle.
