= Mind Storm Labs =

- Company type: Role-playing game publisher
- Industry: Role-playing games
- Founded: 2006
- Defunct: 2012
- Headquarters: Houston, Texas
- Website: www.mindstormlabs.com

Mind Storm Labs was a media production company located in Ottawa, Ontario; Houston, Texas and Orlando, Florida. Their primary focus is on the production of tabletop role-playing games.

The company's flagship product was the tabletop role-playing game, Alpha Omega: The Beginning and The End, which was released in January 2008. Alpha Omega: The Beginning and The End has since received several award nominations, including two 2008 ENnie nominations for best production value and best artwork. Mind Storm Labs was also nominated by fans for the ENnies 2008 Publisher of the Year.

Mind Storm Labs is known outside of the RPG industry for the Ethan Haas Was Right marketing campaign, which it launched in the summer of 2007 to promote the release of the Alpha Omega RPG.

As of January 2017, the company website is down and the company seems to be defunct. The last official Tweet from the company was in 2012.
