= Null allomorph =

Allomorph that is a null morpheme

In morpheme-based morphology, the term null allomorph or zero allomorph is sometimes used to refer to some kind of null morpheme for which there are also contexts in which the underlying morpheme is manifested in the surface structure. It is therefore also an allomorph. The phenomenon itself is known as null allomorphy, morphological blocking or total morpheme blocking.

== English ==
An example of null allomorphy in English is the phrase two fish-∅ which cannot be two fish-es. In addition, according to some linguists such as Radford, in children's language the forms of many auxiliary verbs such as do have null allomorphs in tenseless clauses such as Teddy not go.

== French ==
French has many words ending in a "silent consonant", which is written but not pronounced before a pause or a word beginning with a consonant. It reappears in the case of liaison, e.g. between an article and a nominal syntagm, an epithet adjective and the noun, an adverb and the adjective it modifies, etc. If the following word begins with a vowel (or an "h muet"). Maybe the most common case is that of the articles "les, un, des, aux", etc.: e.g. "les hommes" [lezɔm] (the men) where the -s of the article is realized as [z], vs. "les femmes" [lefam] (the women) where it is silent.

== German ==
Null allomorphy occurs a lot in the grammar of the German language. The singular form of the dative case of masculine and neuter nouns such as der Mann (the man) has an optional grammatical suffix -e: dem Mann-e. However, this suffix is somewhat archaic today and is mainly used in written language. In other cases, its null allomorph occurs: dem Mann-∅.

== Dutch ==
To some extent, null allomorphs also occur in the Dutch language. Many Dutch compound words have an interfix -s which is completely optional: both doodkist and doodskist ("coffin") are possible, as it is the case with spellingprobleem and spellingsprobleem ("spelling problem").

== See also ==
- Alternation (linguistics)
- Morphophonology
