= Surprise Pool =

Hot spring in Teton County, Wyoming, United States

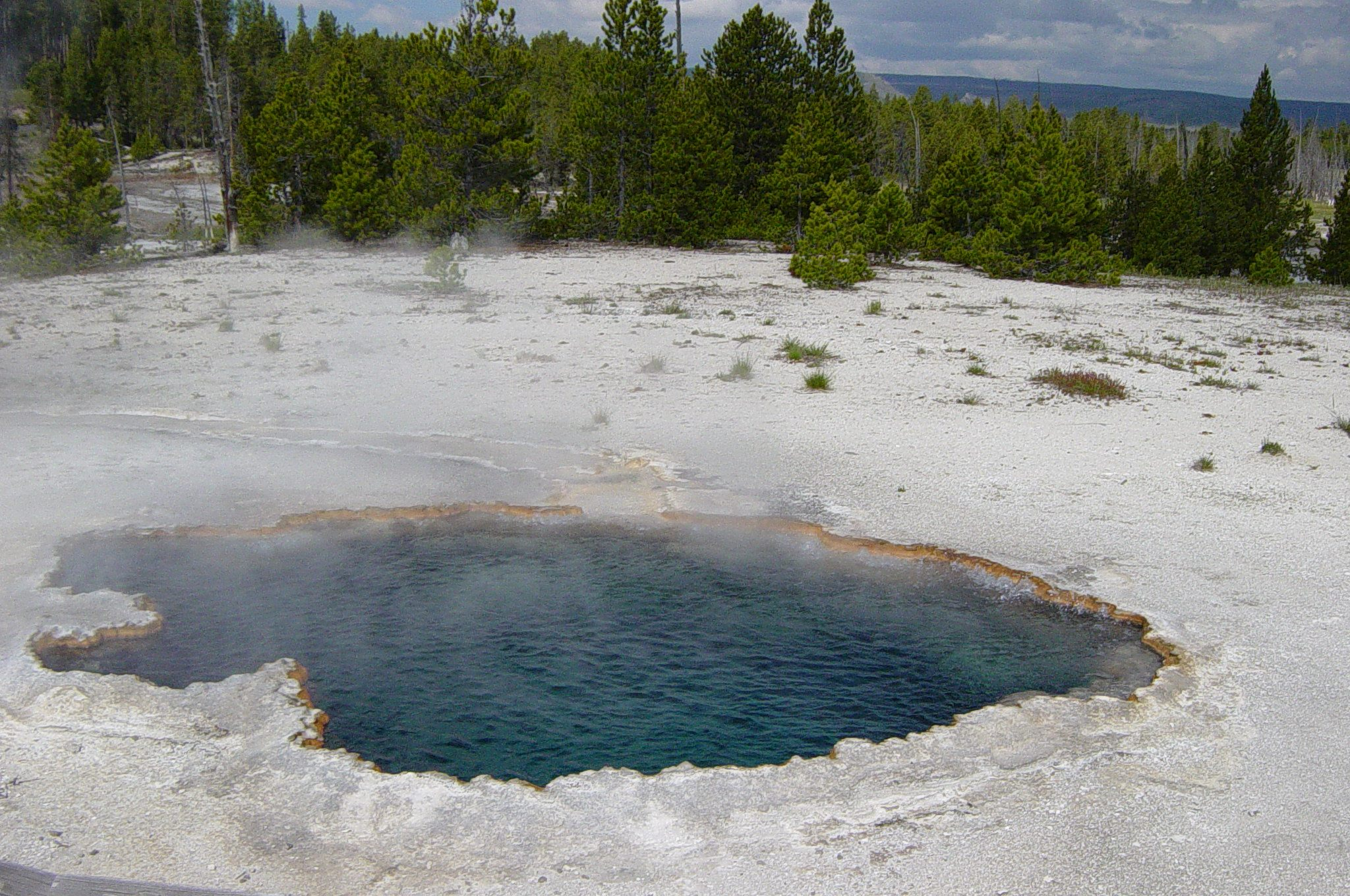
- Surprise Pool
- Interactive map of Surprise Pool
- Location: Lower Geyser Basin, Yellowstone National Park, Wyoming
- Coordinates: 44°32′10″N 110°48′02″W
- Elevation: 7,326 feet (2,233 m)
- Type: Pool

Surprise Pool is a hot spring pool in the Lower Geyser Basin of Yellowstone National Park in the United States. It is located near Great Fountain Geyser and A-0 Geyser.
