= Ao Omae =

Japanese fiction writer

Ao Omae 大前 粟生
- Born: November 28, 1992 (age 33); Hyōgo Prefecture, Japan
- Occupation: Writer
- Writing career
- Genres: short story; flash fiction
- Subject: Gender
- Notable works: Nuigurumi to shaberu hito wa yasashii; Kaitengusa

Ao Omae (大前 粟生, Ōmae Ao; born 1992) is a Japanese fiction writer. Born in Hyōgo Prefecture, he lived in Kyoto until 2022, when he relocated to Tokyo.

== Writing career ==
Omae made his debut in 2016 with the short story "Kanojo wo basutabu ni irete moyasu" (彼女をバスタブにいれて燃やす), which was ranked first place in an open call for stories organized by Granta Japan with Waseda Bungaku. His story "Yuki no ijō na taishitsu mata wa boku wa dore hodo okane ga hoshii ka" (ユキの異常な体質 または僕はどれほどお金がほしいか) won the second Book Shorts Award and was subsequently made into a short film of the same name, given the English title "Ms. Strangedisposition or: How I Desire to Be Rich." For the story "Bunchō" (文鳥), he was awarded Grand Prize in the "at home AWARDs."

Omae made his English-language debut with "Beam," translated by Emily Balistrieri for Electric Lit. Omae's work is known for being "gender-conscious" and often considers the effects of social alienation and the nature of masculinity. The titular novella of the fiction collection Nuigurumi to shaberu hito wa yasashii (ぬいぐるみとしゃべる人はやさしい) was adapted for film and released internationally under the title People Who Talk to Plushies Are Kind. In June 2023, the collection was published in an English translation by Emily Balistrieri under the title People Who Talk to Stuffed Animals Are Nice.

== Selected works ==
=== Story collections ===
- Kaitengusa (回転草) Shoshikankanbou, 2017
- Watashi to wani to imōto no heya (私と鰐と妹の部屋) Shoshikankanbou, 2019
- Nuigurumi to shaberu hito wa yasashii (ぬいぐるみとしゃべる人はやさしい) Kawade Shobo Shinsha, 2020

=== Novels ===
- Omoroi igai iran nen (おもろい以外いらんねん) Kawade Shobo Shinsha, 2021
- Shindeiru watashi to, watashi mitai na hito tachi no koe (死んでいる私と、私みたいな人たちの声) Kawade Shobo Shinsha, 2022
- Kimi da kara sabisii (きみだからさびしい) Bungeishunjū, 2022

== Translations ==
- "Beam." Translated by Emily Balistrieri. Electric Lit. September 2020.
- "Bath Towel Visuals." Translated by Emily Balistrieri. The Southern Review. Summer 2021.
- People Who Talk to Stuffed Animals Are Nice. Translated by Emily Balistrieri. HarperCollins. June 2023.
