= Word =

Basic elements of language

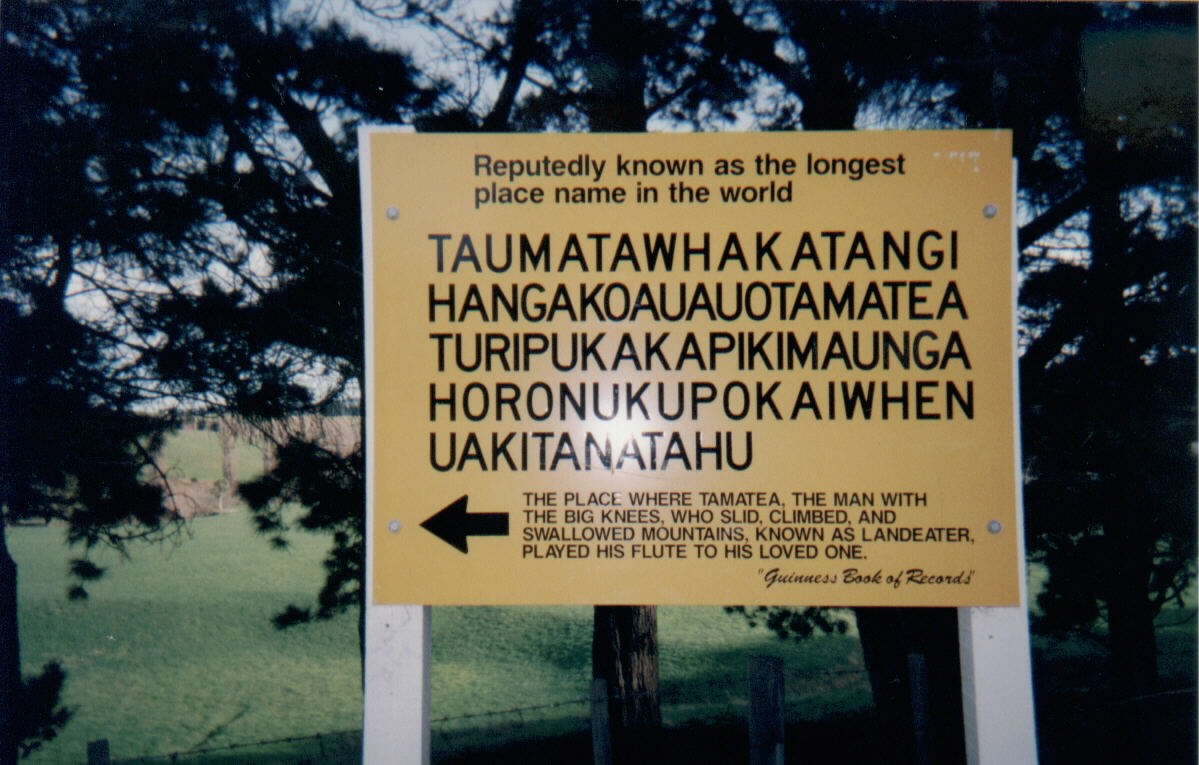
Sign of a New Zealand hill with an unusually long one-word name: Taumatawhakatangihangakoauauotamateaturipukakapikimaungahoronukupokaiwhenuakitanatahu (85 characters)

A word is a basic element of language that carries meaning, can be used on its own, and is uninterruptible. Despite the fact that language speakers often have an intuitive grasp of what a word is, there is no consensus among linguists on its definition and numerous attempts to find specific criteria of the concept remain controversial. Different standards have been proposed, depending on the theoretical background and descriptive context; these do not converge on a single definition. Some specific definitions of the term "word" are employed to convey its different meanings at different levels of description, for example based on phonological, grammatical or orthographic basis. Others suggest that the concept is simply a convention used in everyday situations.

The concept of "word" is distinguished from that of a morpheme, which is the smallest unit of language that has a meaning, even if it cannot stand on its own. Words are made out of at least one morpheme. Morphemes can also be joined to create other words in a process of morphological derivation. In English and many other languages, the morphemes that make up a word generally include at least one root (such as "rock", "god", "type", "writ", "can", "not") and possibly some affixes ("-s", "un-", "-ly", "-ness"). Words with more than one root ("[type][writ]er", "[cow][boy]s", "[tele][graph]ically") are called compound words. Contractions ("can't", "would've") are words formed from multiple words made into one. In turn, words are combined to form other elements of language, such as phrases ("a red rock", "put up with"), clauses ("I threw a rock"), and sentences ("I threw a rock, but missed").

In most languages, the notion of what constitutes a "word" may be learned as part of learning the writing system. This is the case for the English language, and for most languages that are written with alphabets derived from the ancient Latin or Greek alphabets. In English orthography, the letter sequences "rock", "god", "write", "with", "the", and "not" are considered to be single-morpheme words, whereas "rocks", "ungodliness", "typewriter", and "cannot" are words composed of two or more morphemes ("rock"+"s", "un"+"god"+"li"+"ness", "type"+"writ"+"er", and "can"+"not").

== Definitions ==
Since the beginning of the study of linguistics, numerous attempts at defining what a word is have been made, with many different criteria. However, no satisfying definition has yet been found to apply to all languages and at all levels of linguistic analysis. It is, however, possible to find consistent definitions of "word" at different levels of description. These include definitions on the phonetic and phonological level, that it is the smallest segment of sound that can be theoretically isolated by word accent and boundary markers; on the orthographic level as a segment indicated by blank spaces in writing or print; on the basis of morphology as the basic element of grammatical paradigms like inflection, different from word-forms; within semantics as the smallest and relatively independent carrier of meaning in a lexicon; and syntactically, as the smallest permutable and substitutable unit of a sentence.

In some languages, these different types of words coincide and one can analyze, for example, a "phonological word" as essentially the same as "grammatical word". However, in other languages they may correspond to elements of different size. Because of this unclear status, some linguists propose avoiding the term "word" altogether, instead focusing on better defined terms such as morphemes.

Dictionaries categorize a language's lexicon into individually listed forms called lemmas. These can be taken as an indication of what constitutes a "word" in the opinion of the writers of that language. This written form of a word constitutes a lexeme. The most appropriate means of measuring the length of a word is by counting its syllables or morphemes. When a word has multiple definitions or multiple senses, it may result in confusion in a debate or discussion.

=== Phonology ===
One distinguishable meaning of the term "word" can be defined on phonological grounds. It is a unit larger or equal to a syllable, which can be distinguished based on segmental or prosodic features, or through its interactions with phonological rules. In Walmatjari, an Australian language, roots or suffixes may have only one syllable but a phonologic word must have at least two syllables. A disyllabic verb root may take a zero suffix, e.g. luwa-ø 'hit!', but a monosyllabic root must take a suffix, e.g. ya-nta 'go!', thus conforming to a segmental pattern of Walmatjari words. In the Pitjantjatjara dialect of the Wati language, another language from Australia, a word-medial syllable can end with a consonant but a word-final syllable must end with a vowel.

In most languages, stress may serve a criterion for a phonological word. In languages with a fixed stress, it is possible to ascertain word boundaries from its location.

Many phonological rules operate only within a phonological word or specifically across word boundaries. In Hungarian, dental consonants /d/, /t/, /l/ or /n/ assimilate to a following semi-vowel /j/, yielding the corresponding palatal sound, but only within one word. Conversely, external sandhi rules act across word boundaries. The prototypical example of this rule comes from Sanskrit; however, initial consonant mutation in contemporary Celtic languages or the linking r phenomenon in some non-rhotic English dialects can also be used to illustrate word boundaries.

It is often the case that a phonological word does not correspond to our intuitive conception of a word. The Finnish compound word pääkaupunki 'capital' is phonologically two words (pää 'head' and kaupunki 'city') because it does not conform to Finnish patterns of vowel harmony within words. Conversely, a single phonological word may be made up of more than one syntactical elements, such as in the English phrase I'll come, where I'll forms one phonological word.

=== Lexemes ===
A word can be thought of as an item in a speaker's internal lexicon; this is called a lexeme. However, this may be different from the meaning in everyday speech of "word", since one lexeme includes all inflected forms. The lexeme teapot refers to the singular teapot as well as the plural teapots. There is also the question to what extent should inflected or compounded words be included in a lexeme, especially in agglutinative languages. For example, there is little doubt that in Turkish the lexeme for house should include nominative singular ev and plural evler. However, it is not clear if it should also encompass the word evlerinizden 'from your houses', formed through regular suffixation. There are also lexemes such as "black and white" or "do-it-yourself", which, although consisting of multiple words, still form a single collocation with a set meaning.

=== Grammar ===
Grammatical words are proposed to consist of a number of grammatical elements which occur together (not in separate places within a clause) in a fixed order and have a set meaning. However, there are exceptions to all of these criteria.

Single grammatical words have a fixed internal structure; when the structure is changed, the meaning of the word also changes. In Dyirbal, which can use many derivational affixes with its nouns, there are the dual suffix -jarran and the suffix -gabun meaning "another". With the noun yibi they can be arranged into yibi-jarran-gabun ("another two women") or yibi-gabun-jarran ("two other women") but changing the suffix order also changes their meaning. Speakers of a language also usually associate a specific meaning with a word and not a single morpheme. For example, when asked to talk about untruthfulness they rarely focus on the meaning of morphemes such as -th or -ness.

=== Semantics ===
Leonard Bloomfield introduced the concept of "Minimal Free Forms" in 1928. Words are thought of as the smallest meaningful unit of speech that can stand by themselves. This correlates phonemes (units of sound) to lexemes (units of meaning). However, some written words are not minimal free forms as they make no sense by themselves (for example, the and of). Some semanticists have put forward a theory of so-called semantic primitives or semantic primes, indefinable words representing fundamental concepts that are intuitively meaningful. According to this theory, semantic primes serve as the basis for describing the meaning, without circularity, of other words and their associated conceptual denotations.

=== Features ===
In the Minimalist school of theoretical syntax, words (also called lexical items in the literature) are construed as "bundles" of linguistic features that are united into a structure with form and meaning. For example, the word "koalas" has semantic features (it denotes real-world objects, koalas), category features (it is a noun), number features (it is plural and must agree with verbs, pronouns, and demonstratives in its domain), phonological features (it is pronounced a certain way), etc.

=== Orthography ===
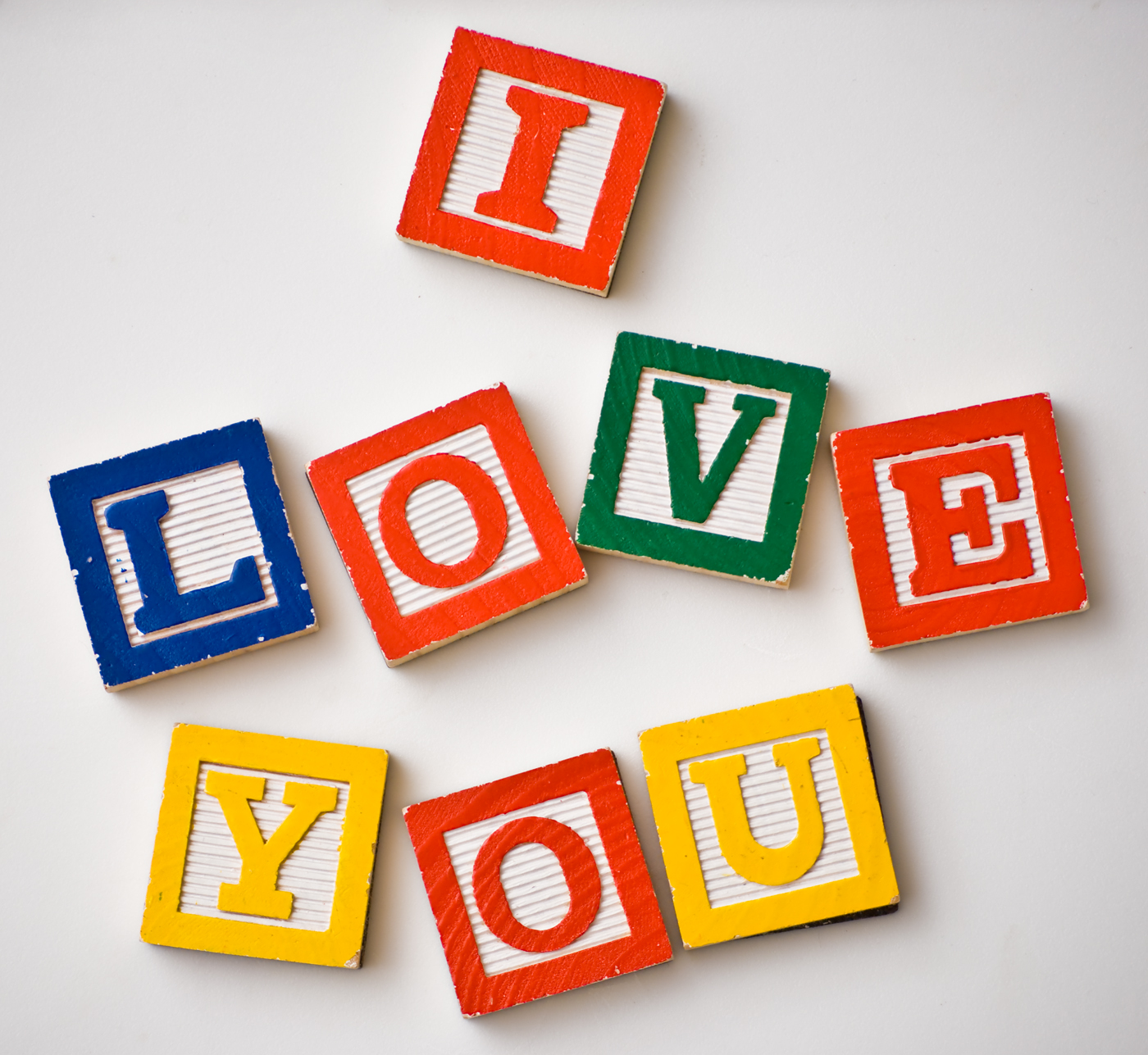
Words made out of letters, divided by spaces

In languages with a literary tradition, the question of what is considered a single word is influenced by orthography. Word separators, typically spaces and punctuation marks are common in modern orthography of languages using alphabetic scripts, but these are a relatively modern development in the history of writing. In character encoding, word segmentation depends on which characters are defined as word dividers. In English orthography, compound expressions may contain spaces. For example, ice cream, air raid shelter and get up each are generally considered to consist of more than one word (as each of the components are free forms, with the possible exception of get), and so is no one, but the similarly compounded someone and nobody are considered single words.

Sometimes, languages which are close grammatically will consider the same order of words in different ways. For example, reflexive verbs in the French infinitive are separate from their respective particle, e.g. se laver ("to wash oneself"), whereas in Portuguese they are hyphenated, e.g. lavar-se, and in Spanish they are joined, e.g. lavarse. (Note: The convention also depends on the tense or mood—the examples given here are in the infinitive, whereas French imperatives, for example, are hyphenated, e.g. lavez-vous, whereas the Spanish present tense is completely separate, e.g. me lavo.)

Not all languages delimit words expressly. Mandarin Chinese is a highly analytic language with few inflectional affixes, making it unnecessary to delimit words orthographically. However, there are many multiple-morpheme compounds in Mandarin, as well as a variety of bound morphemes that make it difficult to clearly determine what constitutes a word. Japanese uses orthographic cues to delimit words, such as switching between kanji (characters borrowed from Chinese writing) and the two kana syllabaries. This is a fairly soft rule, because content words can also be written in hiragana for effect, though if done extensively spaces are typically added to maintain legibility. Vietnamese orthography, although using the Latin alphabet, delimits monosyllabic morphemes rather than words.

== Word boundaries ==
The task of defining what constitutes a word involves determining where one word ends and another begins. There are several methods for identifying word boundaries present in speech:

- Potential pause: A speaker is told to repeat a given sentence slowly, allowing for pauses. The speaker will tend to insert pauses at the word boundaries. However, this method is not foolproof: the speaker could easily break up polysyllabic words, or fail to separate two or more closely linked words (e.g. "to a" in "He went to a house").
- Indivisibility: A speaker is told to say a sentence out loud, and then is told to say the sentence again with extra words added to it. Thus, "I have lived in this village for ten years." might become "My family and I have lived in this little village for about ten or so years." These extra words will tend to be added in the word boundaries of the original sentence. However, some languages have infixes, which are put inside a root. Similarly, some have separable affixes: in the German sentence Ich komme gut zu Hause an, the verb ankommen is separated.
- Phonetic boundaries: Some languages have particular rules of pronunciation that make it easy to spot where a word boundary should be. For example, in a language that regularly stresses the last syllable of a word, a word boundary is likely to fall after each stressed syllable. Another example can be seen in a language that has vowel harmony (like Turkish): the vowels within a given word share the same quality, so a word boundary is likely to occur whenever the vowel quality changes. Nevertheless, not all languages have such convenient phonetic rules, and even those that do present the occasional exceptions.
- Orthographic boundaries: Word separators, such as spaces and punctuation marks can be used to distinguish single words. However, this depends on a specific language. East Asian writing systems often do not separate their characters. This is the case with Chinese and Japanese writing, which use logographic characters, as well as Thai and Lao, which are abugidas.

== Morphology ==
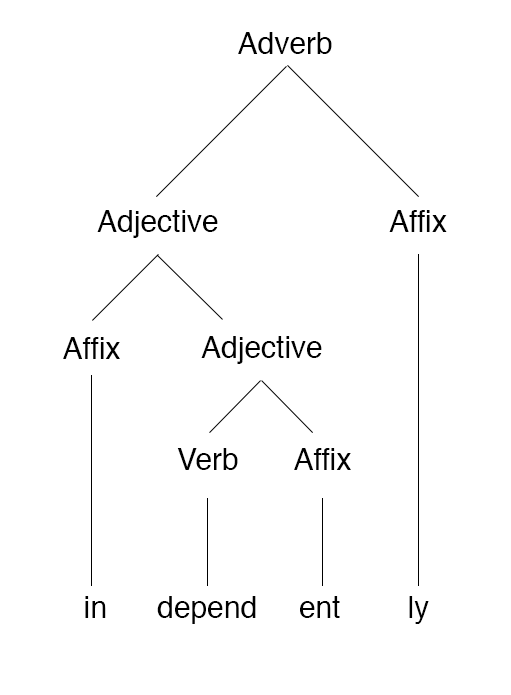
A morphology tree of the English word "independently"

Morphology is the study of word formation and structure. Words may undergo different morphological processes which are traditionally classified into two broad groups: derivation and inflection. Derivation is a process in which a new word is created from existing ones, with an adjustment to its meaning and often with a change of word class. For example, in English the verb to convert may be modified into the noun a convert through stress shift and into the adjective convertible through affixation. Inflection adds grammatical information to a word, such as indicating case, tense, or gender.

In synthetic languages, a single word stem (for example, love) may inflect to have a number of different forms (for example, loves, loving, and loved). However, for some purposes these are not usually considered to be different words, but rather different forms of the same word. In these languages, words may be considered to be constructed from a number of morphemes.

In Indo-European languages in particular, the morphemes distinguished are:

- the root
- multiple possible adfixes
- an inflectional suffix.

Thus, the Proto-Indo-European *wr̥dhom would be analyzed as consisting of

1. *wr̥-, the zero grade of the root *wer-.
2. A root-extension *-dh- (diachronically a suffix), resulting in a complex root *wr̥dh-.
3. The thematic suffix *-o-.
4. The neuter gender nominative or accusative singular suffix *-m.

== Philosophy ==
Philosophers have found words to be objects of fascination since at least the 5th century BC, with the foundation of the philosophy of language. Plato analyzed words in terms of their origins and the sounds making them up, concluding that there was some connection between sound and meaning, though words change a great deal over time. John Locke wrote that the use of words "is to be sensible marks of ideas", though they are chosen "not by any natural connexion that there is between particular articulate sounds and certain ideas, for then there would be but one language amongst all men; but by a voluntary imposition, whereby such a word is made arbitrarily the mark of such an idea". Wittgenstein's thought transitioned from a word as representation of meaning to "the meaning of a word is its use in the language."

== Classes ==
Each word belongs to a category, based on shared grammatical properties. Typically, a language's lexicon may be classified into several such groups of words. The total number of categories as well as their types are not universal and vary among languages. For example, English has a group of words called articles, such as the (the definite article) or a (the indefinite article), which mark definiteness or identifiability. This class is not present in Japanese, which depends on context to indicate this difference. On the other hand, Japanese has a class of words called particles which are used to mark noun phrases according to their grammatical function or thematic relation, which English marks using word order or prosody.

It is not clear if any categories other than interjection are universal parts of human language. The basic bipartite division that is ubiquitous in natural languages is that of nouns vs verbs. However, in some Wakashan and Salish languages, all content words may be understood as verbal in nature. In Lushootseed, a Salish language, all words with 'noun-like' meanings can be used predicatively, where they function like verb. For example, the word sbiaw can be understood as '(is a) coyote' rather than simply 'coyote'. On the other hand, in Eskimo–Aleut languages all content words can be analyzed as nominal, with agentive nouns serving the role closest to verbs. Finally, in some Austronesian languages it is not clear whether the distinction is applicable and all words can be best described as interjections which can perform the roles of other categories.

The current classification of words into classes is based on the work of Dionysius Thrax, who, in the 1st century BC, distinguished eight categories of Ancient Greek words: noun, verb, participle, article, pronoun, preposition, adverb, and conjunction. Later Latin authors, Apollonius Dyscolus and Priscian, applied his framework to their own language; since Latin has no articles, they replaced this class with interjection. Adjectives ('happy'), quantifiers ('few'), and numerals ('eleven') were not made separate in those classifications due to their morphological similarity to nouns in Latin and Ancient Greek. They were recognized as distinct categories only when scholars started studying later European languages.

In Indian grammatical tradition, Pāṇini introduced a similar fundamental classification into a nominal (nāma, suP) and a verbal (ākhyāta, tiN) class, based on the set of suffixes taken by the word. Some words can be controversial, such as slang in formal contexts; misnomers, due to them not meaning what they would imply; or polysemous words, due to the potential confusion between their various senses.

== History ==
Ancient Greek and Roman grammatical tradition, the word was the basic unit of analysis. Different grammatical forms of a given lexeme were studied; however, there was no attempt to decompose them into morphemes. This may have been the result of the synthetic nature of these languages, where the internal structure of words may be harder to decode than in analytic languages. There was also no concept of different kinds of words, such as grammatical or phonological – the word was considered a unitary construct. The word (dictiō) was defined as the minimal unit of an utterance (ōrātiō), the expression of a complete thought.

== See also ==
- Longest words
- Utterance
- Word (computer architecture)
- Word count, the number of words in a document or passage of text
- Wording
- Etymology

== Bibliography ==
- Barton, David (1994). Literacy: an introduction to the ecology of written language. Oxford, UK: Blackwell. p. 96. ISBN 0-631-19089-9. OCLC 28722223.
- The encyclopedia of language & linguistics. E. K. Brown, Anne Anderson (2nd ed.). Amsterdam: Elsevier. 2006. ISBN 978-0-08-044854-1. OCLC 771916896.
- Crystal, David (1995). The Cambridge encyclopedia of the English language. Cambridge [England]: Cambridge University Press. ISBN 0-521-40179-8. OCLC 31518847.
- Plag, Ingo (2003). Word-formation in English. Cambridge: Cambridge University Press. ISBN 0-511-07843-9. OCLC 57545191.
- The Oxford English Dictionary. J. A. Simpson, E. S. C. Weiner, Oxford University Press (2nd ed.). Oxford: Clarendon Press. 1989. ISBN 0-19-861186-2. OCLC 17648714.
