= Hachijō grammar =

Grammatical features of the Hachijō language of Japan

The Hachijō language shares much of its grammar with its sister language of Japanese—having both descended from varieties of Old Japanese—as well as with its more distant relatives in the Ryukyuan language family. However, Hachijō grammar includes a substantial number of distinguishing features from modern Standard Japanese, both innovative and archaic.

Hachijō is head-final, left-branching, topic-prominent, often omits nouns that can be understood from context, and has default subject–object–verb word order. Nouns do not exhibit grammatical gender, nor do they usually indicate grammatical number.

== Pronouns and demonstratives ==
Like Japanese, Hachijō distinguishes first and second person pronouns, and has proximal, mesial, distal, and interrogative demonstratives. Hachijō uses demonstrative pronouns in place of third-person pronouns.

=== Pronouns ===
The pronominal system of Hachijō has been partly inherited from Old Japanese and partly borrowed from Modern Japanese:

Personal pronouns
	Singular	Plural (Note: In the Uphill and Sueyoshi dialects, a different plural marker -Nsjee ~ -ĭsjee is preferred over the -ra listed here. Due to dialectal differences, it appears in Kashitate as [iɕaː], Nakanogō as [nɕaː], and Sueyoshi as [nɕeː].)
1st Person (Note: Both ware and are are used as first-person pronouns across Hachijō, varying depending on dialect and speaker.)	ware (Note: The pronominal endings -re and -rera are sometimes contracted to -ĭ and -ĭra.)	warera
1st Person	are	arera
2nd Person	unu	unura ~ una ~ unara
2nd Person	omee	omeera
2nd Person	omi	omira
2nd Person	omaĭ	omaĭra
2nd Person	nare	narera
Interrogative: "who"	dare	darera
Interrogative: "what"	ani	

The pronouns ware, are, unu, and dare often use irregular nominative/genitive forms with ga: waga, aga, uNga, and daga. The form uNga [uŋ.ɡa] can also be pronounced NNga [ŋ̍ː.ɡa].

Hachijō has a variety of nuances among many of its personal pronouns:

==== First-person pronouns ====
Unlike Japanese, both ware and are (and their variants) are considered ordinary and show no particular variations with regard to politeness, honorifics, or humility. Instead, they vary in usage based on the speaker, dialect, and context. For example, it is possible for both to appear in the same utterance:

are=(w)a wa=ga e=sjaN topi-te ik-a(r)-o =da(r)-o=zjaN
me=TOP me=GEN house=ORNT dash-PTCP go-STAT-ATTR(NMLZ) =COP-ATTR=DECL
"I really dashed off towards my house, huh?"
私が我が家へ駆けて行ったんだよね。

Other variations include the contraction of -re to -ĭ, and the contraction of -re-wa to -ra or -rja when combined with the topic marker wa. For example, uncontracted ware and warewa would be considered more feminine than contracted waĭ and wara in the Mitsune dialect, whereas in the Uphill dialects, ware and warewa would be the norm (with the contracted forms generally unused).

==== Second-person pronouns ====
Like in Japanese, it is most common to refer to an addressee by name rather than by using a pronoun. Nevertheless, several second-person pronouns do exist:

- The pronoun omee is honorific, used for individuals of superior status. As the subject of a clause, omee is generally used with other honorific vocabulary such as the verbs ozjarowa ("to go, to come") and tamourowa ("to give").
- The pronoun omi is polite, used for individuals whom the speaker wants to respect, but for whom the honorific omee would be excessively formal. Aside from a handful of polite verbs like wasowa ("to go, to come") and gouzirowa ("to see"), sentences with omi generally use ordinary vocabulary. The form omi is never seen without a particle.
- The pronoun omaĭ is between omi and unu, used of those of equal or lower status. It is mildly informal or neutral, and it is often used in place of unu when people outside of the speaker's in-group are present. It is a comparatively new pronoun.
- The pronoun unu is very informal or familiar, and it is used for family members, and close friends. However it can be somewhat rude or vulgar, depending on the dialect.
- The pronoun nare is offensive and shows contempt, being used when fighting, arguing, scolding, etc.

The second-person pronouns omee, omi and omaĭ originate in borrowings of Japanese お前 omae "you." In modern Japanese, omae is familiar or derogatory, but it formerly had a respectful meaning, and it is in this respectful usage that it was borrowed into Hachijō.

The pronoun unu has cognates in Old and Middle Japanese 己 ono_{2} ~ unu "yourself, myself, oneself." Similarly, 汝 na ~ nare "you" is found in Old Japanese (including Eastern Old Japanese) and Early Middle Japanese.

==== Third-person pronouns ====
Hachijō has no dedicated third-person pronouns. When necessary, demonstratives—most often distal ones—are employed to indicate the equivalent of the third person. For example, when referring to people:

- ure~uĭ and uĭcu are informal, used for people within one's in-group, as well as for people whom the speaker does not care about showing respect to.
- The form uno hito (plural uno hitora) is polite, used for people outside of one's in-group. It comes from a compound of uno "that" and hito "person."
- The form uno kata (plural uno katara) is honorific, used for referring to superiors. It comes from a compound of uno "that" and kata "person (honorific)."

==== Interrogative pronouns ====
The interrogative personal pronouns are dare "who" for human referents and ani "what" for non-human referents (cognate to Japanese 誰 dare "who" and 何 nani "what"). The pronoun ani is often contracted to aN- when consonant-initial particles are adjoined to it.

Hachijō dare is related to the Old Japanese pronoun ta ~ tare "who," but it is unclear whether the change of initial t to d was borrowed from Japanese or was an independent parallel innovation.

Hachijō ani derives directly from Eastern Old Japanese *ani "what," which is attested indirectly in Eastern Old Japanese compounds like aze "why" and ado_{2} "whatever" (contrast the Western Old Japanese forms naze and nado_{2}, whence Modern Japanese なぜ naze "why" and など nado "et cetera"). There are also a handful of other Hachijō interrogatives historically derived from compounds with ani, such as ada "how," aNde "why," and aNsei "why."

To form indeterminate pronouns from interrogatives, the suffix -ka is added. In contrast to Japanese, this -ka is added after any case suffix, not before, e.g., Hachijō anjoka (ani=o=ka) vs. Japanese 何かを nani-ka o, both "something (accusative case)."

=== Demonstratives ===
A series of demonstratives similar to modern Japanese's ko-so-a-do series (proximal-mesial-distal-interrogative) also exists in Hachijō:

	Proximal (ko-)	Mesial (so-)	Distal (u-) (Note: In the Kashitate dialect, distal demonstratives are formed with o- rather than u-.)	Interrogative (do-)	Japanese cognate
Nominal (sg.) -re (Note: Just as with personal pronouns, these -re and -rera can contract to -ĭ and -ĭra. The form -rera can also become -rara.) "this, that"	kore	sore	ure	dore	～れ -re
Nominal (pl.) -rera (Note: Plurality is only distinguished for humans; all nonhuman antecedents use singular pronouns regardless of their number.) "these, those"	korera	sorera	urera ~ ura	dorera	～れら -rera
Person (sg.) -ĭcu "this person, that person"	koĭcu	soĭcu	uĭcu	doĭcu	～いつ -itsu
Person (pl.) -ĭcura "these people, those people"	koĭcura	soĭcura	uĭcura	doĭcura	～いつら -itsura
Determiner -no "this ~, that ~"	kono	sono	uno	dono	～の -no
Location -ko "here, there"	koko	sono	uku	doko	～こ -ko
Direction -Qci/-QcjaN "hither, thither"	koQci, koQcjaN	soQci, soQcjaN	uQci, uQcjaN aQci, aQcjaN	doQci, doQcjaN	～っち、～ちら(に) -cchi, -chira (ni)
Direction -gata "hither, thither"	kogata	sogata	ugata	dogata	～っち、～ちら -cchi, -chira
Amount, Extent -odo "this much, that much"	koudo, koQdo, koroudo	soudo, soQdo, soroudo	uudo, uQdo, uroudo	doudo, doQdo, doroudo ikura	～れほど -rehodo
Manner, Extent -go͡oN (Note: This -go͡oN is shortened from -gooni "in a ~ way, in a ~ manner," a bound morpheme which is perhaps a contraction from a form related to Early Middle Japanese ～が様に ga yaũ ni, akin to Modern Japanese ～のように no yō ni.) "in this way, in that way"	kogo͡oN	sogo͡oN	ugo͡oN	dogo͡oN adaN (Note: The form adaN is a compound of ada "how, in what way" and the dative -N.)	～う、～んなに -u, -nnani
Type -go͡oNdoo (Note: This -doo is the attributive form of the copular verb dara "to be.") "this kind of, that kind of"	kogo͡oNdoo	sogo͡oNdoo	ugo͡oNdoo	dogo͡oNdoo adaNdoo	～んな -nna

== Particles ==
Like Japanese, Hachijō makes extensive use of grammatical particles, which indicate a variety of meanings and grammatical functions. Most parts of speech can use some particles, but the majority of particles are used with nominals (nouns and pronouns). Hachijō's noun-marking particles are classified similarly to their Japanese counterparts into the following categories:

- Enumerating particles (並べ助詞, narabe-joshi), which mark items in lists.
- Case particles (格助詞, kaku-joshi), which mark the grammatical cases of nominials. These are further divided into:
  - Standalone cases (連用格, ren'yō-kaku), which indicate self-contained phrases such as the subject or object of a sentence.
  - Adjoining cases (連体格, rentai-kaku), which indicate phrases that are semantically linked to another part of the sentence, e.g., to express possession.
- Prominence particles (取り立て助詞, toritate-joshi), a broad category that is further divided into:
  - Topic-focus particles (係り助詞, kakari-joshi), which emphasize, restrict, or otherwise indicate a kind of topic or focus related to the words they mark.
  - Adverbial particles (副助詞, fuku-joshi), which turn words into adverbs of degree, extent, etc.

When multiple particles are used on the same noun, they are generally found in the order Adverbial → Case → Topic-Focus.

=== Enumerating particles ===
Enumerating particles (並べ助詞, narabe-joshi; enum) are few in number, and they are used as conjunctions to join nominals into lists. The main particles of this type are to, ni, toka, da, and ja.

Both to and ni are used for making exhaustive lists, and are used more or less the same as in Japanese. The more usual way to form an exhaustive list is by using to, which is generally placed after every element of a list except the last (where it is optional):

imoto kaNmou nitoke.
imo=to kaNmo=o ni-t(e)-ok-e
taro=ENUM sweet.potato=ACC boil-PTCP-put-IMP
"Boil a taro and a sweet potato."

inumeto sarumeto kizimeN hikeete keete kite
inume=to sarume=to kizime=ni hik-a(s)e-te keer-te ki-te
dog=ENUM monkey=ENUM pheasant=DAT pull-CAUS-PTCP go.home-PTCP come-PTCP
"Having the dog, and the monkey, and the pheasant pull it, and then coming back home..."

The enumerating particle ni, on the other hand, is used in two main ways; the first use of ni emphasizes that the speaker is recalling the elements of the list, in which emphasized elements of the list are marked by ni and other elements left unmarked:

bene, osiroini, kusi, kaNzasi, kasaneno madarani, seQtano zjouri, hakoseko, kagamini, ougini, sigoki...
bene, osiroĭ=ni, kusi, kaNzasi, kasane=no madara=ni, seQta=no zjouri, hakoseko, kagami=ni, ougi=ni, sigoki
rouge, face.powder=ENUM, comb, hair.ornament, layer=GEN fine.clothes=ENUM, leather.soled.sandal=GEN sandal, decorative.pouch, mirror=ENUM, hand.fan=ENUM, waistband
"rouge, and face powder, a comb, a hair ornament, and a fine layered dress, leather-soled sandals, a decorative pouch, and a mirror, and a hand fan, a waistband..."

The second use of ni is found in binomial expressions such as mesini okazu 飯におかず "rice and a side dish". Unlike the case particle N~ni, the enumerating particle ni is not reduced to N after light syllables.

The particles toka, da, and ja, on the other hand, are used for making inexhaustive lists:

hijootoritoka aNtokano hito
hijootori=toka an(i)=toka=no hito
day.laboring=ENUM what=ENUM=GEN person
"A person who (does) day labor and whatever else"

magamadaa, tegagadaa, kusakakidaateQte soreizunjadoozja jou.
magama=da, tegaga=da, kusakaki=da=tew-te sorei-zu=nja=da(r)-o=zja jou
sickle=ENUM, hoe=ENUM, grass.cutter=ENUM=QUOT.say-PTCP gather-NEG.INF=DAT.TOP=COP-ATTR=DECL DM
"When it comes to sickles, and hoes, and grass-cutters, and such, you've got to have them all."

hasija aniQka otereba
hasi=ja ani=ka ote-reba
chopstick=ENUM what=INDET fall-PROV
"If a chopstick or something falls..."

=== Case particles ===
The majority of case particles (格助詞, kaku-joshi) in Hachijō indicate standalone cases (連用格, ren'yō-kaku). The most common standalone case particles are:

Particle	Japanese cognate	Meaning and examples
ga	が ga	Both particles of these particles mark the nominative case (nom), often used to indicate the subject of a clause. The particle ga is more common than no, but the choice between ga and no is influenced by the subject's animacy (human & proper nouns vs. other nouns) and the type of predicate in the clause. Generally, ga is universally appropriate: 私が 学問嫌いで waga gakumoNgireede... wa=ga gakumoNgiree=de me=NOM learning.hating=COP.PTCP "I hate(d) school, and..." However, inanimate subjects (that is, non-human and non-proper noun subjects) have the option of using no when used with a verb or verbal adjective predicate, especially (but not necessarily) when the predicate is subordinate: あいつこそ 足が 速い。 uika asino hajake. uĭ=ka asi=no haja-ke. that.person=FOC foot=NOM fast-ADJ.EXCL "That person, for sure, is quick-footed." jadoteQte noo jadono aroadoazja. jado=tew-te nou jado=no ar-a(r)-o=da(r)-o=zja house=QUOT.say-PTCP DM house=NOM be-STAT-ATTR(NMLZ)=COP-ATTR=DECL. "(He) said (there was) a house, you see, and there was one!" iiwa sjuutoojano tatete kete e=o=wa sjuutouja=no tate-te ke-te house=ACC=TOP father.in.law=NOM build-PTCP give-PTCP "This house, my father-in-law built for me, and..." However, when a predicate is of the form nominal+copula, the subject of its clause generally does not use no. (Both ga and no also serve as markers for the genitive case—see below in the "adjoining cases" table for more details.)
no	の no	
o~jo	を o	Marks the accusative case (acc), usually used to indicate the direct object of a clause. Due to fusing morphophonemically with its host noun, this particle has several allomorphs, and it has been leveled to jo after non-light syllables (see the section on particle fusion for more details on the various forms of this particle). For an example of direct object use: kikoutei korei cumitate jare. kik-ou-tei kore=o cumitate jar-e listen-VOL-SIMUL this=ACC snack.on.INF do(HON)-IMP "While you're listening, snack on this." Like Japanese を wo, it can also be used perlatively, indicating a place through which an action takes place: toricubosaga teNneijo makimiQte arowa. toricubosa=ga teNnei=jo mak-i-mik-te ar-o=wa bird=NOM sky=ACC fly-INF-walk-PTCP be-ATTR=DECL "Birds are flying around through the sky." However, contrary to Japanese を wo, Hachijō o~jo is also used with non-verbal and stative predicates like hosikja "to want" (a verbal adjective) and sukidara "to like" (an adjectival noun) to indicate the object of desire, affection, etc.: utaja teekou sukidoode uta=ja teeko=o suki=da(r)-o=de song=ENUM drum=ACC liking=COP-ATTR(NMLZ)=COP.PTCP "I like songs and drums, so..." It can also be used in some situations where Japanese uses the dative-locative に ni instead, such as when marking a person to whom something is said: hitou acumaQtouteQte hito=o acumar-tou=tew-te person=ACC gather-REQ=QUOT.say-PTCP "telling the person 'Group up!' ..." Finally, o~jo can attach to nouns in order to show mirativity: ai, deecike hanoo! aĭ deeci-ke hana=o wow pretty-ADJ.ATTR flower=ACC "My, what a pretty flower!" わぁ、 速い！ ai, hajasoo! aĭ haja-sa=o wow fast-ADJ.NMLZ=ACC "Wow, how fast!" This mirative function of o~jo can be used with nominalized attributive forms of verbs. When used without a stative suffix, it expresses surprise at the continuation of an action, and when with a stative suffix, it expresses surprise at the resulting state of an action: まぁ、 この人、 飲んでる！ baa, kora nomou! baa kor(e=w)a nom-o=o oh.my this.person=TOP drink-ATTR(NMLZ)=ACC "Oh my, this person is drinking!" (continuing state) もう、 乾いてる！ haa, kookarou! haa kook-ar-o=o geez dry-STAT-ATTR(NMLZ)=ACC "Geez, (the laundry) is already dry?!" (resulting state) Mirative o~jo can also be used with the infinitive form, also expressing surprise at a resulting state (similar to using it with the stative & nominalized attributive). This emphasizes the intensity of the action that led to the state: ai, aga hetaN kakjo! aĭ a=ga heta=N kak-i=o wow me=NOM unskillful=DAT write-INF(NMLZ)=ACC "Wow, I wrote that really badly!"
N~ni	に ni	Marks the dative (dat), used for indicating the recipient of an action, the destination of an action, or the location of a state. In passive sentences, it instead marks the agent of an action. Generally, the form N is usually found after light syllables, whereas ni is usually seen after heavy syllables, though there are exceptions (such as in the second example below). This particle overlaps in usage with the allative i~jii and lative gee. waga tonariN suNde aroo ohojo-obasaN wa=ga tonari=N sum-te ar-a(r)-o ohojo-oba-saN me=GEN next.door=DAT reside-PTCP be-STAT-ATTR Ohoyo-aunt-HON "Ms. Ohoyo, the older woman who used to live next to me" kono aseiwa wareni hutacu anedaraa kono asei=wa ware=ni hutacu ane=dar-(o=w)a this.ATTR older.brother=TOP me=DAT two.things senior=COP-ATTR=DECL "This older brother is two years older than me." ara hooni waikjuuretara ar(e=w)a hoo=ni waĭkjuw-are-tar-(o=w)a me=TOP mother=DAT scold-PASS-STAT-ATTR=DECL "I was scolded by my mother." areN soiga kimerareisi are=N soĭ=ga kime-rare-isi me=DAT that=NOM decide-PASS-DUB "That can't be decided by me." When the dative ni is followed by the topic-marking particle wa, they often coalesce into nja: manja macuno kiwa iQpoNmo nakute ma=nja macu=no ki=wa iQpoN=mo na-kute now=DAT.TOP pine=GEN tree=TOP one=even not-ADJ.PTCP "Now, there isn't even one pine tree left, and..." toNmetenja rokuziN okitara. toNmete=nja roku-zi=N oki-tar-(o=w)a morning=DAT.TOP six-o'clock=DAT awaken-STAT-ATTR=DECL "This morning, I woke up at 6 o'clock." This case marker is cognate or identical with the infinitive form ni of the copula dara.
i~jii	へ e	Marks the allative (all), used for indicating motion toward a place or the purpose for which an action is done. Etymologically from the same source as Japanese へ e, but after phonemically fusing with its host noun and undergoing historical sound shifts, it was leveled to i in most cases and thence became jii after non-light syllables (see the section on particle fusion for more details on the various forms of this particle). Overlaps in usage with the dative N~ni and lative gee. baasamawa kooii seNtakuN ikaraQteiga baa-sama=wa koo=jii seNtaku=N ik-ar-ar-(u)=tew-o=ga grandma-HON=TOP river=ALL laundry=DAT go-STAT-STAT-FIN=QUOT.say-ATTR=but "I hear that Grandma went to the river to do laundry, but..." siQtei sikero siQte=i sike-ro back=ALL withdraw-IMP "Step back!" Hachijō sometimes prefers i~jii to mark the infinitive of purpose, rather than using the dative N~ni: keiwa kusatorii ikoga kei=wa kusator-i=i ik-o=ga today=TOP cut.grass-INF=ALL go-ATTR=but "I will/would go in order to cut the grass today, but..."
gee	(?) がり gari	Marks the lative case (lat), used for indicating the intended direction or destination of an action. Overlaps in usage with the dative N~ni and allative i~jii. sono noogee itoo suQtotei, noQte jurerodara sono noo=gee ita=o suk-totei nor-te jur-e-ro=dar-(o=w)a that.ATTR rope=LAT board=ACC lay-ANT ride-PTCP swing-POT-ATTR(NMLZ)=COP-ATTR=DECL "After laying a board on that rope, you can ride it and swing." kono kudagee itou touii kono kuda=gee ito=o tous-(te) this.ATTR pipe=LAT thread=ACC put.through-PTCP "putting a thread through this pipe..." Comparisons have been drawn between Hachijō gee, dialectal mainland Japanese gai~gee~gyaa, and Okinawan Nkai—all of allative or directive meaning—tentatively connecting them with the Old Japanese directive suffix ～がり -gari.
sjaN	さまに sama ni	Marks the orientative case (ornt), indicating a direction facing which an action is performed or a state exists. In the Sueyoshi dialect, this particle can instead take the form sima. garimewa jokosjaN eemowa garime=wa joko=sjaN eem-o=wa crab=TOP side=ORNT walk-ATTR=DECL "Crabs walk sideways." migisjaN mawaseba migi=sjaN mawas-eba right=ORNT turn-PROV "if/when you turn it to the right..." arja waga esjaN topite ikaadaazjaN are=wa wa=ga e=sjaN topi-te ik-a(r)-o=da(r)-o=zja-N me=TOP me=GEN house=ORNT dash-PTCP go-STAT-ATTR(NMLZ)=COP-ATTR=DECL-Q "I really dashed off towards my house, huh?" jamasima jama=sima fields=ORNT "towards the fields"
de	で de	Marks the locative-instrumental case (loc), used to indicate the location or situation in which an action is done, or an instrument with which an action is performed. sjakude mizuu nomuna sjaku=de mizu=o nom-una ladle=LOC water=ACC drink-PROH "Don't drink water with a ladle." kurano toboude otoQcaNjo buQkoreite kura=no tobou=de otoQcaN=jo buQ-koros-te storehouse=GEN entrance=LOC father.HON=ACC INTS-kill-PTCP "slaughtering his father at the entrance of the storehouse..." bjoukide cino iroga kooraQteija bjouki=de ci=no iro=ga koor-ar-(u)=tew-o=wa illness=LOC blood=GEN color=NOM change-STAT-FIN=QUOT.say-ATTR=DECL "I hear that his blood changed color when he was sick." This case marker is cognate or identical with the participle form de of the copula dara.
to	と to	Marks the comitative case com, used to indicate together with whom or what an action is performed, or to indicate the object of comparisons or contrasts in state. Related or identical to the enumerating particle to, but distinct from the quotative particle to and the suffix -to used in certain conditional statements. adaN nareto nomeisi adaN nare=to nom-e-isi however you(OFNS)=COM drink-POT-DUB "There's no way I could ever drink with you." koito cigoujo moQte ko koĭ=to cigaw-o=jo mot-te ko this=COM differ-ATTR(NMLZ)=ACC hold-PTCP come.IMP "Bring one that's different from this one."
kara~kaa	から kara	Marks the ablative case (abl), used to indicate motion away from a place, or a time after which an action progresses. When following the participle form of a verb, it always expresses the meaning "after." The form kaa is a variant with r-elision. judokara kuQde judo=kara kum-te well=ABL draw.water-PTCP "Drawing water from a well..." kora momokaa umaretoote kor(e=w)a momo=kaa um-are-ta(r)-o=(N)te this=TOP peach=ABL give.birth-PASS-STAT-ATTR=because "This was because he was born from a peach." kuraN sitakara usuu hiQkorogasi-deete kura=n(o) sita=kara usu=o hiQ-korogas-i-das-te storehouse=GEN underneath=ABL millstone=ACC INTS-roll-INF-take.out-PTCP "rolling a millstone out from under the storehouse..."
jori~jei	より yori	Marks the comparative case (cmpr), indicating a noun that is inferior in a comparison or that is being compared against. The form jei, now old-fashioned, is a variant with r-elision. omeega hou kuwasikja, waijori omee=ga hou kuwasi-ke=(w)a waĭ=jori you(HON)=GEN part knowledgeable-ADJ.ATTR=DECL me=CMPR "You're more knowledgeable—more than me." koNdaNno kaNmowa kjoneNjei kosidara koNdaN=no kaNmo=wa kjoneN=jei kosi=dar-(o=w)a this.year=GEN sweet.potato=TOP last.year=CMPR few=COP-ATTR=DECL "There are fewer sweet potatoes this year compared to last year." This particle can also be used like to to indicate an object of contrast: koijei becjo moQte ko koĭ=jei becu=o mot-te ko this.one=CMPR different=ACC hold-PTCP come.IMP "Bring one that's different from this one."
made	まで made	Marks the terminative case (term), used to indicate an action or state's progression up until a place or time. jeenemade iQtemo jeene=made ik-te=mo Yaene=TERM go-PTCP=even "Despite going as far as Yaene..." omeewa koQkaa ukumade sijare omee=wa kok(o)=kaa uku=made s-i-jar-e you(HON)=TOP here=ABL there=TERM do-INF-HON-IMP "Please do it from here to over there."
madeN~madeni	までに madeni	Marks a deadline before which an action takes place or is expected to take place (glossed as "by" below). Etymologically a combination of the terminative case made and the dative case N~ni. zjuunizimadeN zjuuni-zi=madeN twelve-o'clock=by "by twelve o'clock"
gara~gaa	(?) がり gari	Marks a noun whose portion, function, or location is being considered (glossed as "portion" in the examples below). The form gaa is a variant with r-elision, and the forms nogara~nogaa (combined with the genitive no) are also seen. iQsjakugara saNmoNmedaraa iQsjaku=gara saN-moNme=dar-(o=w)a one.shaku=portion three-monme=COP-ATTR=DECL "For one shaku (of fabric), it's three momme (of thread)." diaciku site uro hitonogaa moQte iQte deeci-ku si-te ur-o hito=no=gaa mot-te ik-te clean-ADJ.INF do-PTCP sell-ATTR person=GEN=portion hold-PTCP go-PTCP "Cleaning up (the fish) and bringing it to a seller..." mamakonogaawa miQcubugeejo nitoQtei mamako=no=gaa=wa miQcubugee=jo ni-t(e)-ok-te stepchild=GEN=portion=TOP three.grain.gruel=ACC boil-PTCP-put-PTCP "boiling three grains' worth of rice gruel for the stepchild's portion..." Kaneda (2001) notes that gara is unlikely to be a true case-marking particle, but as it occupies a similar spot in the particle hierarchy, it is tentatively included with them. He also notes that gara probably has some relationship with the Old Japanese directive suffix ～がり -gari.

The smaller class of adjoining case (連体格, rentai-kaku) particles is largely based around the genitive case (marked by ga or no) and compounds thereof:

Particle	Japanese cognate	Meaning and examples
ga	が ga	Both particles mark the genitive case (gen), used to indicate possession and similar relationships. Generally, humans use ga, while non-humans use no; The major exceptions are that long-dead historical figures and ancestors can optionally use no, and individualized animals such as pets tend to use ga instead of no. The particle no is also preferred when another particle comes between no and the nominal, such as in the compounds karano and madeno (listed below). narega kosjo miro nare=ga kosi=o mi-ro you(OFNS)=GEN lower.back=ACC look-IMP "Look at your lower back." sadaiciga edemo sadaici=ga e=de=mo Sadaichi=GEN house=COP.PTCP=even "Despite it being Sadaichi's house..." hukurono sokoga naQkede hukuro=no soko=ga na-ke=de bag=GEN bottom=NOM not-ADJ.ATTR(NMLZ)=COP.PTCP "Because the bag has no bottom..." Though it is not common, the genitive no can occasionally be reduced to N: kuraN sitakara usuu hiQkorogasi-deete kura=n(o) sita=kara usu=o hiQ-korogas-i-das-te storehouse=GEN underneath=ABL millstone=ACC INTS-roll-INF-take.out-PTCP "rolling a millstone out from under the storehouse..." Ga is usually preferred over no in the phrase -ga hou (Japanese ～のほう no hou), used to mark something that is superior in a comparison; the hou in this phrase also usually takes no case marker of its own: ukuga hou maciQto toujamadara uku=ga hou maciQto tou-jama=dar-(o=w)a there=GEN part somewhat far-field=COP-ATTR=DECL "That place over there is a field that is a little more distant." Lastly, the genitive does not necessarily require a noun to follow it, if it can be inferred from context: uno neQkomegoo kono neQkomeN nomaretara uno neQkome=ga=∅=o kono neQkome=N nom-are-tar-(o=w)a that.ATTR cat=GEN=∅=ACC this.ATTR cat=DAT drink-PASS-STAT-ATTR=DECL "This cat drank that cat's (drink)."
no	の no	
karano~kaano	からの kara no	A combination of the ablative kara~kaa and the genitive no. Means roughly "which is from" or "who is from." kunikarano kjaku kuni=kara=no kjaku mainland=ABL=GEN guest "a guest from Tokyo" saNzikaano nigijaka saN-zi=kaa=no nigijaka three-o'clock=ABL=GEN party "the party that starts at 3 o'clock"
madeno	までの made no	A combination of the terminative made and the genitive no. Means roughly "which is until." dehunemadeno ito de-hune=made=no ito go.out.INF-ship=TERM=GEN timespan "the time until the boat's departure" kuregatamadeno nigijaka kuregata=made=no nigijaka evening=TERM=GEN party "the party that lasts until the evening"

=== Prominence particles ===
The first type of prominence particles (取り立て助詞, toritate-joshi) are known as topic-focus particles (係り助詞, kakari-joshi), which introduce either a topic or focus component of a sentence. The particles wa, mo, sika, made, and see do not affect the conjugation of a sentence's verb, while the focus particles ka & koo and the interrogative particle ka do affect it.

Particle	Japanese cognate	Meaning and examples
wa	は wa	(top) Introduces a contrastive topic or new information, often translatable as "as for ~" or "when it comes to ~."
mo	も mo	Introduces an inclusive topic or something related to previously established information, often translatable as "~ also" or "~ too." When following the participle form of a verb or adjective, mo can be translated with a meaning like "even though" or "even if." The form demo, a compound with the participle de of the copula dara, is a specialized use of this particle.
sika	しか shika	Used with negative sentences to indicate a sole exception, often translatable as "nothing but ~" or "except ~."
made	まで made	The same as the terminative case particle made listed previously, but used with a topic-focus meaning. Used to emphasize that even the marked element is to be included despite expectation, often translatable as "even ~."
see	さえ sae	Shows a similar but stronger type of emphasis as made, again often translatable as "even ~."

Finally, the following three particles affect the inflection of the subsequent verb:

Particle	Japanese cognate	Meaning and examples
ka	(?) こそは koso wa	(foc) Generally equivalent in use to Classical Japanese こそ koso. Marks a noun as a focused element in the sentence, often translatable as "it is ~ that" or "~ is that which." Requires the main verb of the sentence to be in its exclamatory form rather than a declarative form. To make such sentences tag questions or to add emphasis, the sentence-final particle ga can be added after the verb. Examples can be found in the section on exclamatory kakari-musubi. Sample sentences from NINJAL (1950) show this particle used both in combination with and interchangeably with koso~koo. Kaneda (2001) hypothesizes that this ka originally comes from an extreme contraction of koso wa.
koo	(?) こそは＋は koso wa + wa	(foc) A contraction of the focus particle ka and the topic-marking wa. Marks a noun as a focused element in the sentence, often translatable as "it is ~ that" or "~ is that which." Requires the main verb of the sentence to use the focalizing extension -naw- in its exclamatory form -nee. To make such sentences tag questions or to add emphasis, the sentence-final particle goo (a contraction of ga and wa) can be added after the verb. Examples can be found in the section on focalized exclamatory kakari-musubi below. Kaneda (2001) hypothesizes that ka originally comes from an extreme contraction of koso wa, meaning that etymologically, koo (itself from ka-wa) would contain wa twice.
ka	か ka	(q) Although questions in Hachijō can often be expressed without being marked by an interrogative particle, this particle ka serves to explicitly mark questions, particularly yes–no questions. The forms kaa and kaĭ can also be seen in cases where this particle is sentence-final. Details on the usage of this particle can be found in the section on interrogative sentences.

Adverbial particles (副助詞, fuku-joshi) express adverbs of degree, extent, etc.

Particle	Japanese cognate	Meaning and examples
guree	ぐらい gurai	Expresses that a stated amount or measurement is approximate: saNzuNgureeni kirete aQtaka noo saNzuN=guree=ni kire-te ar-ta=ka noo three.sun=about=DAT be.cut-PTCP be-JPST=Q QT "I think it might've been cut into roughly 3-sun-long pieces." It can also be used to indicate something of lowly status: aregureenja oseitemo jokaNnouzja are=guree=nja osei-te=mo jo-kar-(u)-naw-o=zja me=about=DAT.TOP teach-PTCP=even good-ADJ-FIN-CNJEC-ATTR=DECL "You could at least tell the likes of me." (In the previous example, areNguree (are=N=guree, me=dat=about) would also be acceptable in place of aregureenja.)
dake	だけ dake	Expresses that the marked word is unique or exclusive: warja no, asidakewa taQsjada ware=wa no asi=dake=wa taQsja=da me=TOP DM leg=only=TOP robust=COP.JPRS "My legs are only thing about me that's strong." When combined with the demonstratives kore, sore, ure, or dore, this particle instead indicates the extent of an action: joku uidake kaketaNnouto moQte waimo sobeite jo-ku uĭ=dake kak-e-tar-(u)-naw-u=to (o)mow-te waĭ=mo sobei-te good-ADJ.INF that=extent write-POT-STAT-FIN-FOCLZ-FIN=QUOT think-PTCP me=also be.surprised-PTCP "Even I was surprised, wondering how was I able to write that much, and..." In older speech, koudake "to this extent" and doudake "to what extent" can also be seen. These are believed to be contracted from earlier forms *ko(re)-hodo-dake and *do(re)-hodo-dake.
baQkari ~ baQkaĭ	ばかり bakari	Expresses the current limit, current extent, etc. of something: ura gakeebaQkai bouku naQte maada cigocigosite damedara ur(e=w)a gakee=baQkaĭ bou-ku nar-te maada cigocigo=si-te dame=dar-(o=w)a that.person=TOP body=just big-ADJ.INF become-PTCP still childishness=do-PTCP no.good=COP-ATTR=DECL "He's grown up in appearance only; he's still childish, so he's no good." horikotonaQtotei wareibaQkai semerowa horikotonaQtotei ware=o=baQkaĭ seme-ro=wa in.a.crowd me=ACC=just assail-ATTR=DECL "They all gang up together on just me." jamade mukasiwa noo harujamapusibaQkarikoa utoaNnee noo jama=de mukasi=wa nou haru-jama-pusi=baQkari=koo utaw-ar-(u)-naw-e nou field=LOC long.ago=TOP DM spring-mountain-melody=just=FOC sing-STAT-FIN-FOCLZ-EXCL DM "In the old days, the only thing we sang in the fields was 'Spring Mountain Melody,' you know." omiga noo hjakusjoojo sjomo jooizja naQkja. {mainici hinici} teNkidato jamabaQkaride naa omi=ga nou hjakusjou=jo sj-o=mo joui=de=(w)a na-ke=(w)a maĭnici-hinici teNki=da=to jama=baQkari=de naa you(POL)=NOM DM peasant=ACC do-ATTR(NMLZ)=also simple=COP.PTCP=TOP not-ADJ.ATTR=DECL every.day-date weather=COP.JPRS=if field=just=COP.PTCP DM "It's not easy to be a lowly farmer, you know. If it's (hot and sunny) weather day in and day out, all (that there is) is the fields."
hodo	ほど hodo	Expresses an adverb of degree or extent in comparison to the marked word: unohitohodowa nomiNnaka uno-hito=hodo=wa nom-i-Nnak-(o=w)a that.ATTR-person=extent=TOP drink-INF-NEG-ATTR=DECL "I won't/don't drink as much as that person." This particle hodo has specialized forms when combined with demonstratives, and these forms depend on dialect. The major variants are koudo–soudo–uudo, koQdo–soQdo–uQdo, and koroudo–soroudo–uroudo. nibaNga koraodo nibaN=ga koroudo second.one=NOM this.extent "The second (squeezing of tea seed oil) (is) about this much."
Nsee ~ Ncjee	？	Broadens the meaning of a noun phrase to include other examples of the same thing or similar things. The form -Ncjee is found in the Sueyoshi dialect. Following the restriction on superheavy syllables, this suffix becomes -see ~ -cjee following a heavy syllable. Cognate with the plural suffix -Nsjee ~ -isjee used for pronouns in the Uphill Dialects and Sueyoshi.

=== Particle fusion ===
Some particles, particularly o~jo, i~jii, and N~ni, regularly undergo fusion with their host word:

	Bare form	With o~jo (を)	With i~jii (へ)	With N~ni (に)
a-final	...a	...oo	...ee	...aN
i-final	...i	...jo (Note: In the Aogashima and Sueyoshi dialects, the sequence ...i + -o yields ...ii rather than ...jo.)	...ii	...iN
u-final	...u	...uu	...ii	...uN
e-final	...e	...ei	...ei	...eN
o-final	...o	...ou	...ei	...oN
long vowel-final	...VV	...VVjo	...VVjii (Note: In the Aogashima dialect, these cases of jii [iː] instead become rii [ɾiː].)	...VVni (Note: In rare and fossilized situations, a long vowel followed by the N~ni particle can instead become a shortened long vowel followed by N. For example, the ending -gooni "in ~ way, in ~ manner" found after demonstratives can be shortened to -go͡oN.)
N-final	...N	...Njo	...Njii	...Nni

In summary, words ending in light syllables undergo fusion with underlying *o, *i, and *N; whereas words ending in non-light syllables use the static longer forms jo, jii (Aogashima dialect rii), and ni.

In some older texts, the topic-marking particle wa (corresponding to Japanese は wa) can also be seen contracting with host nominals it follows (for example, ...ci + wa → ...cja), but most such contractions with wa have fallen out of use in the present day. Surviving exceptions generally involve the pronominal ending -re (see below) contracting with wa to make -ra or -rja, or the combination of wa with other particles like -ni-wa → -nja.

== Verbals ==
=== Verbal chains ===
All Hachijō verbals (verbs and verbal adjectives) make use of a variety of suffixes to indicate the verb's grammatical and semantic function. Suffixes attach to a phonological base form called the stem, occasionally triggering minor allophony; this combination of a stem and various suffixes creates a verb chain, which is one polymorphemic word. Verbal suffixes can be broadly classified into derivations, endings, auxiliaries, extensions, and postfixes:

Verb derivations attach to the stem and create a longer verb stem to which further suffixes can attach. They can combine with each other, in the order (Stem →) Causative → Passive or Potential → Stative → Retrospective or Past Subjunctive.

Verbal endings are always mandatory, with each verb using one. Endings generally end verb chains, but there are certain suffixes (auxiliaries and extensions) that can restart the verb chain. Depending on the exact function of the ending, the resulting verb can be finite or non-finite.

Verbal auxiliaries are verbs or verblike forms that attach to the infinitive, forming serial verb constructions. Being verbals, they themselves take endings of their own, restarting the verb chain. Verbal extensions are similar to auxiliaries, but attaching to the final form (or a Japanese-style tense) instead.

Verbal postfixes are like auxiliaries and verbal extensions in that they attach verb endings to extend the verb chain, but are also like verbal endings in that they conclude a verb chain.

Derivations	Endings	Auxiliaries (Note: Attach to infinitives.)	Extensions (Note: Attach to final forms.)	Postfixes
causative -ase-; passive -are-; potential -e-; stative -ar- ~ -tar-; retrospective -ci; past subjunctive -oositar- ~ -isitar- ~ -roositar-	attributive form -o ~ -ro; final form -u ~ -ru; infinitive -i; negative infinitive -izu ~ -azu ~ -zu; conditional gerund -aba ~ -ba; imperative form -e ~ -ro; exclamatory form -e ~ -re; provisional gerund -eba ~ -reba; concessive gerund -edou ~ -redou; dubitative -oosi ~ -isi ~ -roosi; optative -oosunou ~ -isunou ~ -roosunou; intentional gerund -oosjaate ~ -isjaate ~ -roosjaate; volitional form -ou ~ -rou; participle -te; requisitional form -tou; anterior gerund -toQtei ~ -totei; futile-hypothetical gerund -jaatei ~ -rjaatei; Japanese-style present -u ~ -ru; Japanese-style past -ta and -taQta; Japanese-style representative gerund -tari	new-type negative -Nnak-; old-type negative -Nzjar-; -genar- "seems to"; honorific -jar-; humble -itas-; non-intentional -imadow- (Note: Only attaches to negative infinitive -zu, making -ziimadow-.); lexical auxiliaries (-mik-, -das-, etc.)	conjectural -naw-; focalizing -naw-; suppositional -rasi-kja	Attaching to the final form: prohibitive -na; jussive -beki; Japanese-style negative presumptive -mee; Attaching to the infinitive: simultaneous gerund -gacu ~ -gacura; simultaneous gerund -nagara; Attaching to the volitional form: simultaneous gerund -tei; Attaching to a Japanese-style tense: Japanese-style present presumptive -darou; Japanese-style past presumptive -rou

While most suffixes follow the above categories and combination rules, there are exceptions, such as nomiziisi "won't not drink," which contains two endings in a row: the negative infinitive -izu and the dubitative -isi.

Lastly, there are several particles that can attach to certain verb forms, usually the attributive, infinitive, or participle. These are considered to be clitics that attach themselves to verb chains, not part of the chain themselves:

- declarative particles -wa, -zja
- question particles -ka, -kaN, -ĭ, etc.
- conjunctional particles -Nte, -karanja, -ni, -de, -ga, -to, etc.
- case particles -i, -ni, -kara, -o, etc.

=== Conjugation classes ===
Due to sound changes and other historical developments, the conjugation patterns found in Eastern Old Japanese have separated into several more distinct patterns in Hachijō. The following list of conjugation classes is derived from Kaneda (2001):

Class 1.1A verbs — strong consonant-stem, participle Qte
Consonant-stem verbs whose stem ends in a light syllable followed by k, t, r, or a strong w. It also includes the verb jowa "to say," whose stem is nominally *iw- but becomes j- when followed by a vowel. Class 1.1A verbs with stems in w all have only a single short syllable before the w; other w-stem verbs are of Class 1.1A'.
Examples: kakowa "write," katowa "win," torowa "take," kawowa "buy," macikowa "curse," jowowa "get drunk," butowa "hit," jowa "say."
Class 1.1A-uw verbs — strong uw-stem, participle Qte
Consonant-stem verbs whose stem ends in u followed by a mostly-strong w. They differ from Class 1.1A w-stem verbs only in the attributive and final forms (and derived forms), where uw-o and uw-u contract to uu. Like w-stem Class 1.1A verbs, this class consists of verbs that have only a single syllable before the w. Kaneda classifies these verbs as a special subclass of 1.1A' verbs (subclass 1.1A'a), but they are separated here for clarity.
Examples: nuuwa "sew," kuuwa "eat," suuwa "suck," juuwa "tie up."
Class 1.1A' verbs — Weak w-stem, participle Qte
Consonant-stem verbs whose stem ends in a light syllable followed by a weak w. They can be subclassified into 1.1A'b (stem-final uw-), 1.1A'c (stem-final ow-), and 1.1A'd (stem-final aw-). For some speakers, particularly in Downhill dialects, verbs that once followed this conjugation have been partly or completely converted to Class 1.1B by treating the stative stem (with -ar-) as a new base stem.
Examples: (b) huruuwa "shake," sukuuwa "scoop"; (c) omouwa "think," irouwa "bully"; (d) cukouwa "use," warouwa "laugh," juwouwa "celebrate," -nouwa "(conjectural suffix)."
Class 1.1B verbs — strong consonant-stem, participle te
Consonant-stem verbs whose stem ends in a heavy syllable followed by k, t, or r.
Examples: kourowa "freeze," keerowa "go home," koorowa "change," kookowa "dry," cjoorowa "touch."
Class 1.1C verbs — semi-strong r-stem, participle Qte
Consonant-stem verbs created from the stative suffix -ar- or another combination with the existence verb ar-, like the copula dara (from de + arowa). Non-verbal adjectives such as heta "unskilled, crude" also can be said to follow this conjugation, as they use the copula dara in order to describe nouns, e.g., hetadoo sito "an unskilled person." Kaneda classifies these verbs as a special class of 1.1A verbs, but they are separated here for clarity.
Examples: dara "be (copula)," oora "be, exist," -(t)ara "(stative suffix)," -Nzjara "(Old-Type negative)."
Class 1.2A verbs — strong consonant-stem, participle Nde
Consonant-stem verbs whose stem ends in a light syllable followed by m, b, g, or n.
Examples: kamowa "eat," nomowa "drink," jemowa "smile," asubowa "play," marubowa "die," ojogowa "swim," kasjagowa "slant," cinowa "die."
Class 1.2B verbs — strong consonant-stem, participle de
Consonant-stem verbs whose stem ends in a heavy syllable followed by m, b, or g.
Examples: houmowa "contain," eemowa "walk," soogowa "clamor."
Class 1.3A verbs — weak s-stem, short-euphonic
Consonant-stem verbs whose stem ends in a light syllable followed by a weak s; this s becomes a coalescing i in certain inflections. For some speakers, particularly in Uphill dialects, verbs that once followed this conjugation are now conjugated as class 1.3B partly or completely instead.
Examples: dasowa "take out," watasowa "send across," modosowa "put back," nabusowa "hide."
Class 1.3A' verbs — weak s-stem, long-euphonic
Consonant-stem verbs whose stem ends in a heavy syllable followed by a weak s; this s becomes (non-coalescing) ii in certain inflections. For some speakers, particularly in Uphill dialects, verbs that once followed this conjugation are now conjugated as class 1.3B partly or completely instead.
Examples: tousowa "put through," keesowa "give back," mousowa "say," moosowa "spin."
Class 1.3B verbs — strong s-stem (non-euphonic)
Consonant-stem verbs whose stem ends in a light syllable followed by a strong s. It is unclear whether these verbs derive from regularization of Class 1.3A and 1.3A' verbs by eliminating their euphony, or if they never had euphony to begin with.
Examples: hesowa "push," kesowa "erase," kasowa "lend," josowa "quit."
Class 2 verbs — vowel-stem
Vowel-stem verbs. They can be subclassified into Class 2a (ending in i-), Class 2b (ending in e-), Class 2c (ending in ee-), and Class 2d (ending in ei-).
Examples: kirowa "wear," jerowa "insert," keerowa "mix," jamerowa "suffer," meirowa "burn," oseirowa "teach," irowa "sit."
Class 3 verbs — irregular
Irregular verbs, which share a mix of features from Classes 1 and 2, as well as other irregularities.
Examples: sjowa "do," (de)kurowa "come."
Verbal adjectives (VA)
One of the two types of adjectives in Hachijō. Verbal adjectives follow an idiosyncratic conjugation pattern that is supplemented with forms in -kar- (conjugated as Class 1.1C).
Examples: boukja "big," sjokja "known," hajakja "fast," toukja "far," takakja "high," nagakja "long."
New-type negative
A hybrid between the Class 1.1C and verbal adjective classes that is used to conjugate the New-Type Negative auxiliary verb. It has a highly variable stem form of -Nnak- ~ -Nnar- ~ -Nnakar-; how it inflects will be noted in the following subsections. It is used in the Downhill Dialects instead of the Old-Type Negative, which instead consists of the regular Class 1.1C auxiliary -Nzjara.
Sole example: -Nnaka "(New-Type negative)."

A table summarizing some of the basic forms of each conjugation class is shown below:

Class	Example	Attributive	Declarative	Infinitive	Negative	Participle	Stative	Conditional	Exclamatory	Final (Note: The final form (旧終止形, kyū-shūshikei) given here should not be confused with the Japanese-style present tense, which occasionally takes different forms.)
1.1A	kak- "write"	kako	kakowa	kaki	kakiNnaka	kaQte	kakar-	kakaba	kake	kaku-
1.1A	kat- "win"	kato	katowa	kaci	kaciNnaka	kaQte	katar-	kataba	kate	kacu-
1.1A	tor- "take"	toro	torowa	tori	toriNnaka	toQte	torar-	toraba	tore	toru-
1.1A	kaw- "buy"	kawo	kawowa	ka(w)i (Note: The w in Class 1.1A and 1.1A-uw w-stem verbs is sometimes dropped in pronunciation before i, and always before u, but it the i and u remain distinctly in their own syllable, not combining with the preceding syllable.)	ka(w)iNnaka	kaQte	kawar-	kawaba	kawe	kau-
1.1A	iw- "say"	jo	jowa	i(i)	iNnaka, iinaka	iQte	jar-	jaba	je	ju-
— (Note: This form is a situational contraction of the quotative particle -te followed by the Class 1.A verb iw- "to say," but it is highly defective and conjugates irregularly.)	-tew- "(reportative)"	-tei (Note: Only usable when followed by the copular participle de or the particle -(N)te "because.")	-teija (Note: This form is -teiwa in the Aogashima dialect.)	—	—	-teQte	—	—	—	—
1.1A-uw (1.1A'a)	nuw- "sew"	nuu	nuuwa	nu(w)i	nu(w)iNnaka	nuQte	nuwar-	nuwaba	nuwe	nuu-
1.1A'b (Note: In some dialects, especially the Downhill dialects of Mitsune and Ōkagō, Class 1.1A' verbs have been partly or fully converted into Class 1.1A r-stem verbs by treating the stative stem as a new root stem. In such cases, the stative thus requires another addition of -ar- to the (new) stem.)	huruw- "shake"	huruu	huruuwa	hurii	huriinaka	huruQte	huruur-	huruuba	hurii	huruu-
1.1A'c	omow- "think"	omou	omouwa	omei	omeinaka	omoQte	omoor-	omooba	omei	omou-
1.1A'd	waraw- "laugh"	warou	warouwa	waree	wareenaka	waraQte	waroor-	warooba	waree	warou-
1.1B	kook- "dry"	kooko	kookowa	kooki	kookiNnaka	koote	kookar-	kookaba	kooke	kooku-
1.1B	keer- "go home"	keero	keerowa	keeri	keeriNnaka	keete	keerar-	keeraba	keere	keeru-
1.1C	dar- "(copula)"	doo	dara	dari daĭ (Note: The Class 1.1C copula dara sometimes uses the infinitive ni, but the regular dari ~ daĭ is also used in certain situations.)	*daNnaka (Note: The copula dara does not use the regular negative paradigms, instead using the phrase zja nakja (←*dewa nakja) with the verbal adjective nakja "not." In addition, due to the order in which suffixes attach to verbs, the stative -(t)ar- never precedes the negative -Nnaka, instead combining as -Nn(ak)ar-ar-.)	daQte (Note: The Class 1.1C copula dara usually uses the participle de in place of daQte.)	darar-	da(r)aba	dare daĭ (Note: In the Class 1.1C exclamatory form, -re can contract to -ĭ only when followed by the concessive gerund-forming suffix -dou.)	*daru- (Note: The final forms of 1.1C verbs and the New-Type Negative generally reduce the syllable *ru to Q, N, or coalescing u depending on the attached suffix or particle. For example, the particle -to "if" usually uses u, the focalizing and conjectural suffixes -naw- use N, and the reportative -teija uses Q.)
1.2A	nom- "drink"	nomo	nomowa	nomi	nomiNnaka	noNde	nomar-	nomaba	nome	nomu-
1.2A	asub- "play"	asubo	asubowa	asubi	asubiNnaka	asuNde	asubar-	asubaba	asube	asubu-
1.2A	ojog- "swim"	ojogo	ojogowa	ojogi	ojogiNnaka	ojoNde	ojogar-	ojogaba	ojoge	ojogu-
1.2A	cin- "die"	cino	cinowa	cini	ciniNnaka	ciNde	cinar-	cinaba	cine	cinu-
1.2B	eem- "walk"	eemo	eemowa	eemi	eemiNnaka	eede	eemar-	eemaba	eeme	eemu-
1.2B	soog- "clamor"	soogo	soogowa	soogi	soogiNnaka	soode	soogar-	soogaba	sooge	soogu-
1.3A	das- "take out"	daso	dasowa	dasi	dasiNnaka	dasite dee(te) (Note: In these forms with an elided s, the te of the participle is optional. Dropping it is a characteristic of the Downhill dialects.)	dasitar- deetar-	dasaba	dase	dasu-
1.3A	modos- "put back"	modoso	modosowa	modosi	modosiNnaka	modosite modei(te)	modositar- modeitar-	modosaba	modose	modosu-
1.3A	nabus- "hide (tr.)"	nabuso	nabusowa	nabusi nabii	nabusiNnaka	nabusite nabii(te)	nabusitar- nabiitar-	nabusaba	nabuse	nabusu-
1.3A	tames- "attempt"	tameso	tamesowa	tamesi	tamesiNnaka	tamesite tamee(te) (Note: In this verb, which is the only Class 1.3A verb ending in -es-, *tame(s)i- irregularly becomes tamee-, not the expected **tamei-.)	tamesitar- tameetar-	tamesaba	tamese	tamesu-
1.3A'	tous- "put through"	touso	tousowa	tousi	tousiNnaka	tousite touii(te)	tousitar- touiitar-	tousaba	touse	tousu-
1.3A'	kees- "give back"	keeso	keesowa	keesi	keesiNnaka	keesite keeii(te)	keesitar- keeiitar-	keesaba	keese	keesu-
1.3B	hes- "push"	heso	hesowa	hesi	hesiNnaka	hesite	hesitar-	hesaba	hese	hesu-
2a	ki- "wear"	kiro	kirowa	ki	kiNnaka	kite	kitar-	kiba	kire	ki(ru)- (Note: Class 2 verbs and kurowa "to come" can sometimes include -ru in their final forms. Where it is optional, the forms lacking -ru are typical of older speech, and the forms with them, of newer speech.)
2b	je- "insert"	jero	jerowa	je	jeNnaka	jete	jetar-	jeba	jere	je(ru)-
2c	kee- "mix"	keero	keerowa	kee	keenaka	keete	keetar-	keeba	keere	kee(ru)-
2d	mei- "burn"	meiro	meirowa	mei	meinaka	meite	meitar-	meiba	meire	mei(ru)-
3	s(j)- "do"	sjo (Note: The older forms so (attributive) and sowa (declarative) are also attested.)	sjowa	si	siNnaka	site	sitar-	saba	se, sje	su-
3	k(o)- "come"	kuro	kurowa	ki	kiNnaka	kite	kitar-	koba	kure	ku(ru)-
VA	sjo- "known" (Note: A small number of monomoraic-stem verbal adjectives like jokja "good" and nakja "not" tend to geminate the initial k on many adjectival forms: joQkja, joQke, etc. The forms without gemination are older.)	sjo-ke	sjo-kja	sjo-ku	(sjo-ku nakja) (Note: Negative verbal adjectives are formed phrasally with the infinitive -ku followed by the verbal adjective nakja (stem na-) "nonexistent.")	sjo-kute	sjo-karar-	sjo-kaba sjo-ka(r)aba (Note: The form -kaba reflects Eastern Old Japanese -kaba (EOJ *-ke-aba → -kaba), whereas -ka(r)aba uses the Class 1.1C stem -kar- (*-kar-aba → -ka(r)aba).)	sjo-ke(re) (Note: The form -ke is used in isolation (in exclamatory kakari-musubi), whereas -kere is used for forming the provisional and concessive gerunds. As neither reflects the Eastern Old Japanese form -ka, these may be borrowed from Japanese.)	sjo-ke- (Note: This form is only used before the conditional -to.) *sjo-karu-
New Neg.	-Nn(ak)-	-Nnoo -Nnako (Note: The form -Nnako is old-fashioned.)	-Nnaka	-zu	—	-zuto	-Nn(ak)arar-	-Nn(ak)a(r)aba	-Nn(ak)are	*-Nnaru-

=== Verbal affixes ===
==== Attributive -o ====
The attributive form (連体形, rentaikei; attr) is made by adding the suffix -o to the stems of Class 1 verbs, -ro to those of Class 2, and -ke to verbal adjectives'. For irregular verbs, sjowa becomes sjo, and kurowa becomes kuro. This form descends from the Eastern Old Japanese attributive form -o_{1} ~ *-uro_{1}.

On its own, the attributive serves a similar function to an English relative clause, for defining or classifying nominals:

kei kitoo tegami
kei ki-ta(r)-o tegami
today come-STAT-ATTR letter
"the letter which came today"

meejo niro toki
mee=jo ni-ro toki
cocoon=ACC boil-ATTR time
"(at) the time when I was boiling cocoons"

Unlike in Modern Japanese, clauses in Hachijō also can be nominalized directly using the attributive form of a verb (glossed as attr(nmlz)). When nominalized in this way, the clause becomes a noun meaning "the act of ~ing", "the fact of ~ happening", "one who ~s", "that which is ~ed," etc., depending on context. Compare these near-identical constructions in Hachijō and Japanese, where Japanese requires the nominalization particle の no, but Hachijō does not:

袋の 底が 無い の で
hukuro=no soko=ga na-ke {} =de
fukuro=no soko=ga na-i no =de
bag=GEN bottom=NOM not-ADJ.ATTR (NMLZ) =COP.PTCP
"Because the bag has no bottom..."

歌や 太鼓が 好き な の で
uta=ja teeko=o suki =da(r)-o {} =de
uta=ya taiko=ga suki na no =de
song=ENUM drum=ACC/NOM liking =COP-ATTR (NMLZ) =COP.PTCP
"I like songs and drums, so..."

This function of the attributive was also a feature of Japanese up until the early modern period, during which の no became used as a nominalization particle.

See also the section on mermaid constructions, which make ample use of the attributive form.

===== Declarative particles -wa and -zja =====
The default form of the declarative (断定, dantei; decl) in Hachijō is formed by adding the declarative particle -wa to the attributive form (連体形, rentaikei) of verbs. For a slightly assertive or emphatic statement, the particle -zja can replace -wa. The particles wa and zja come from Old Japanese は pa and にては nite pa → dewa, respectively. The wa-declarative form serves as the dictionary form of verbals.

Originally, these particles followed the Old Japanese attributive in its nominalized form, creating a topicalized nominal; in Hachijō, they have become markers of independent clauses, almost completely supplanting the original final form in this particular use:

garimewa jokosjaN eemowa.
garime=wa joko=sjaN eem-o=wa
crab=TOP side=ORNT walk-ATTR=DECL
"Crabs walk sideways."

toricubosaga teNneijo makimiQte arowa.
toricubosa=ga teNnei=jo mak-i-mik-te ar-o=wa
bird=NOM sky=ACC fly-INF-walk-PTCP be-ATTR=DECL
"Birds are flying around through the sky."

uiga nomunou aimo hosiku narodoozja.
uĭ=ga nom-u-naw-u aĭ=mo hosi-ku nar-o=da(r)-o=zja
that.person=NOM drink-FIN-FOCLZ-JPRS me=also wanting-INF become-ATTR(NMLZ)=COP-ATTR=DECL
"That person will drink, so I will want some, too."

With verbal adjectives, the attributive -ke merges with -wa to become -kja:

omeega hou kuwasikja, waijori.
omee=ga hou kuwasi-ke=(w)a waĭ=jori
you(HON)=GEN part well.informed-ADJ.ATTR=DECL me=CMPR
"You're better informed—more than me."

Verbs of Class 1.1C also merge their attributive with -wa, contracting -owa irregularly to -a. For instance, the copula dara has the attributive form *dar-o → doo, but this is blocked by the addition of -wa, as -owa contracts to -a instead, viz., *dar-o-wa → dara.

miga narara.
mi=ga nar-ar-(o=w)a
fruit=NOM grow-STAT-ATTR=DECL
"Fruit has grown."

ara hooni waikjuuretara.
ar(e=w)a hoo=ni waĭkjuw-are-tar-(o=w)a
me=TOP mother=DAT scold-PASS-STAT-ATTR=DECL
"I was scolded by my mother."

A similar variation can be seen in the New Negative, which has the attributive form *-Nnako → -Nnoo but a declarative form *-Nnakowa → -Nnaka.

meNkjoga naQkeNte uNteN sareNnaka.
meNkjo=ga na-ke=Nte uNteN s-are-Nnak-(o=w)a
license=NOM not-ADJ.ATTR=because driving do-PASS.INF-NEG-ATTR=DECL
"Since you don't have a license, you can't drive." (possible state)

karasumeN torarete tedoreNnaka.
karasume=N tor-are-te tedor-e-Nnak-(o=w)a
crow=DAT take-PASS-PTCP obtain-POT.INF-NEG-ATTR=DECL
"It was taken by crows, so you're not going to be able to get it."

The declarative particle zja has no special contracted forms, always attaching directly to the attributive, e.g., nomozja "drinks," doozja "is." It has also been noted to take the form -zjaN in the Sueyoshi dialect.

===== Other particles used with the attributive =====
Because of its nominalization function, the attributive form can be followed by any particle that can follow a noun, such as case particles. However, in addition, there are several other particles can also attach particularly to the attributive forms of verbals:

Particle	Japanese cognate	Meaning
-go͡oN "let's"	(?) ～が様に ga yō ni	Creates a cohortative predicate, suggesting that the speaker and listener do something together.
-ga "but, yet"	～が ga	Marks the verb as contrasting with the following clause. In many cases, the following clause is left implicit.
-Nte "because"	～によって ni yotte	Marks the verb as a reason or cause; the following clause is its result or consequence.
-karanja "now that"	～からには kara ni wa	A combination of the ablative -kara, dative -ni, and topic marker -wa. Marks the verb as an action that has completed, and as a result of its completion, the speaker is commanding or advising the listener to do something. This form always follows a verb with the stative, and it is followed by a verb with a commanding or hortative meaning.

The clitic -Nte is a shortened form of -joNte, itself an extreme contraction and metathesis of -ni joQte, related to Japanese ～によって ni yotte "due to, by means of." This clitic has significant variance between dialects when it occurs after long vowels, shown here on ikowa "to go" as an example:

Dialect	After iko "goes"	After ikoo "went"
Mitsune	ikoNte [ikonte]	ikoote [ikoːte]
Ōkagō	ikoNte [ikonte]	ikoote [ikoːte]
Kashitate	ikoĭte [ikoite]	ikoaite [ikoɐite] (Note: Whether this is a case of a superheavy triphthong [i.koɐi.te] or separate syllables [i.koɐ.i.te] is not clear.)
Nakanogō	ikoNte [ikonte]	ikoaNte [ikoɐnte] (Note: Whether this is a case of a superheavy syllable [i.koɐn.te ~ i.kaːn.te] or a syllabic N [i.koɐ.n̩.te ~ i.kaː.n̩.te] is not clear.)
Sueyoshi	ikoNte [ikonte]	ikaaNte [ikaːnte]
Aogashima	ikoNte [ikonte]	ikoote ~ ikaote [ikoːte ~ ikɔute]
Minami Daitō	ikoNte [ikonte]	ikoote [ikoːte]

Some speakers of the Nakanogō and Kashitate dialects were also noted to have used the older form -joNte [jonte] after both long and short vowels as late as 1950.

==== Infinitive -i ====
The infinitive (連用形, ren'yōkei; lit. "connective-use form," inf) is made by adding the suffix -i to the stems of Class 1 verbs, nothing to those of Class 2, and -ku to verbal adjectives'. For irregular verbs, sjowa becomes si, and kurowa becomes ki. This form descends from the Old Japanese infinitive -i_{1}. Negative verbs also have a suppletive infinitive form where the whole negative auxiliary -Nnaka or -Nzjara is replaced by -zu, from Old Japanese -zu ← -ni su (possibly reborrowed through Japanese).

This is a non-finite form used similarly to Japanese's infinitive: to link several verbs in a clause, for serial verb constructions, attaching auxiliary verbs, as a method of nominalizing verbs, etc.

===== Infinitive as an independent predicate =====
Certain independent predicates can make use of the infinitive form instead of an ordinary finite predicate.

Simple infinitive predicates can be used to refer to actions in the immediate past, or to indicate that the speaker is speaking to themself, or both:

soide zeNbu heeri!
soĭ=de zeNbu heer-i
that=LOC everything enter-INF
"And with that, all (of the balls) have entered (in the gate)." (immediate past)

aa owari!
aa owar-i
ah end-INF
"Ah, it's over!" (immediate past)

ara kanasike terebjo miruto, sugu benarare.
ar(e=w)a kanasi-ke terebi=o mi-ru=to sugu benar-are
me=TOP sad-ADJ.ATTR television=ACC see-JPRS=if soon cry-PASS.INF
"Whenever I watch a sad television show, I quickly start crying." (speaking to self)

ura icumo heNdoo kotou ii.
ur(e=w)a icu=mo heN=da(r)-o koto=o iw-i
that.person=TOP when=also strange=COP-ATTR thing=ACC say-INF
"That person always says strange things." (speaking to self)

aasike obakirekeebjouno goN sugu hiNmodori.
aasike oba-kire-keebjou=no go͡oN sugu hiQ-modor-i
INTERJ tail-cut-lizard=GEN way soon INTS-return-INF
"Honestly, it came back just like a lizard's tail does when cut off." (immediate past & speaking to self)

In a reduplicated form with -mo "also, even," specifically of the form nomimo nomi (for nomowa "to drink"), infinitive predicates are used to assert of the truth of the speaker's statement. This kind of statement is used without regard to time:

dekimo deki.
dek-i=mo dek-i
come-INF=also come-INF
"(I) will certainly come." (future reference)

arimo ari. siQkari arozja.
ar-i=mo ar-i siQkari ar-o=zja
be-INF=also be-INF greatly be-ATTR=DECL
"Of course there are (some). There are a lot!" (present reference)

igoroo sikimo siki.
igoro=o sik-i=mo sik-i
snoring=ACC spread^{(?)}-INF=also spread^{(?)}-INF
"It's true; I used to snore." (past reference)

maNmo noNde aroka? / noNde arimo ari.
ma=N=mo nom-te ar-o=ka / nom-te ar-i=mo ar-i
now=DAT=even drink-PTCP be-ATTR=Q / drink-PTCP be-INF=also be-INF
"Do you still drink? / Of course I drink." (general reference)

Another use of an infinitive predicate can be found in certain types of questions, as discussed in a section below.

===== Infinitive-derived expressions =====
A number of auxiliary verbs can be used with the infinitive, all of which are derived from grammaticalized verbs:

Auxiliary	Class	Independent cognate	Example
-mikowa	1.1A	mikowa "to walk"	nomimikowa "does things like drinking"
-hazimerowa	2b	hazimerowa "to start"	nomihazimerowa "starts to drink"
-dasowa	1.3A	dasowa "to send out"	nomidasowa "starts to drink"
-dousowa -tousowa	1.3A'	tousowa "to put through"	nomidousowa "completely finishes drinking"
-cuzukerowa	2b	cuzukerowa "to continue"	nomicuzukerowa "continues to drink"
-kirowa	1.1A	kirowa "to cut"	nomikirowa "completely finishes drinking"
-genara	1.1C	-ge "seeming" + nar- "(copula)" (Note: Either fossilized from earlier Hachijō or borrowed from Middle Japanese なり nar-.)	nomigenara "seems to drink"
-jarowa	1.1A	jarowa "to give" (honorific)	nomijarowa "(an esteemed person) drinks"
-itasowa	1.3A	itasowa "to do (humble)"	nomiitasowa "(I) humbly drink"

The negative verbal auxiliaries -Nnaka and -Nzjara, discussed in a later subsection, are also attached to the infinitive.

Similarly, there are a number of derived adjectives or adjective-like expressions built on the infinitive form:

Auxiliary	Class	Independent cognate	Example
-takja	VA	itakja "painful" (Note: Or calqued from Japanese ～たい -tai, from 痛い ita-i "painful," the cognate to itakja.)	nomitakja "wants to drink"
-soudara	1.1C	そう -sō (Note: Borrowed from Japanese.) + dara "(copula)"	nomisoudara "seems to drink"
-siNdara	1.1C	siN "(etymology unknown)" + dara "(copula)"	nomisiNdara "is welcome to drink, is allowed to drink"
-tedara	1.1C	te "hand" + dara "(copula)"	nomitedara "is someone who can drink"

And several conjunctional forms as well:

- reduplicated (e.g., nominomi) — Indicates that an action is iterative. Used by itself, it serves as an adverbial phrase indicating that the iterative action was performed simultaneously with another, whereas when used with sjowa "to do" (e.g., nominomi sjowa), it simply indicates repeated action. Reduplicated verbs do not undergo vowel coalescence, e.g., okoriokori "happening again and again," not **okorjokori.
- -nagara ~ -nagaa — Indicates that an action is performed simultaneously with another, e.g. nominagara "while drinking." This formation is synonymous with the simultaneous gerund in -outei. Cognate with Japanese ～ながら -nagara.
- -gacu ~ -gacura — Indicates that an action is performed simultaneously with another, often coincidentally or through the exact same action, e.g. nomigacu "while one happens to be drinking." This form is limited to verbs that involve agency on the subject's part, and is also not usually used with motion verbs without an implicit endpoint (e.g., eemowa "walk," hasirowa "run"), intransitive bodily activities or functions (e.g. tatowa "stand"), or transitive verbs where an action is performed only once to one object (e.g., sasagowa "put on one's head"). Related to Japanese ～がてら -gatera.
- -i (allative) or -ni (dative) — Indicates the purpose for which another action was performed, e.g. nomii or nomini "in order to drink." Using the allative -i is the more common than the dative -ni for this purpose, but both can be found.

==== Negative infinitive -zu ====
The negative infinitive (neg.inf) can be made in two different ways. The first way is by simply appending -zu to the regular infinitive form, e.g., nomizu "not drinking" (but is treated here as its own suffix). The second way is by adding -azu to the stems of Class 1 verbs, and -zu to those of Class 2. In this latter way, for irregular verbs, sjowa becomes sazu, sjazu, or sezu; and kurowa becomes kozu.

The negative infinitive is used in many of the same situations that the regular infinitive is used word-finally (that is, without any suffixes). However, there are some specialized constructions used with -zu:

- -zuN ~ -zuni (-zu-ni, neg.inf-dat), which acts as an adverbial phrase meaning "without ~ing," e.g., nomazuN "without drinking." It can also be used with a similar meaning to a negative participle.
- -zunja (-zu-nja, neg.inf-dat.top), which acts as an adjectival noun and expresses necessity, e.g., nomazunjadara "must drink, have to drink." This form likely originally meant "if one does not ~," to be followed by a phrase such as damedara "it would not be good," but only the copula dara has remained. Compare Japanese ～なきゃ -nakya, ～なくちゃ -nakucha, and ～ないと -nai to, which literally mean "if one does not," but can express a necessitative meaning even without a following clause.

In addition, there are a handful of derived forms from -zu:

- Negative Participle -zuto (neg.ptcp), used for conjunctive constructions with the particle -mo "even," e.g., nomazutomo "even not drinking, even if he doesn't drink." In general, this competes as the negative participle with -Nsjade and the dative-marked -zuN ~ -zuni.
- Negative Dubitative -ziisi (-zu-isi, neg.inf-dub), used as a kind of double negative to show what is not doubted, etc. (e.g., nomiziisi "won't not drink"). This competes with the regularly-formed -Nnakaroosi and Nzjaroosi, formed from the negative auxiliaries -Nnaka and -Nzjara.
- Non-Intentional -ziimadouwa (-zu-imadow-, neg.inf-try), a derived Class 1.1A'c verb that expresses a lack of trying to do something, or seeming not to do something, e.g., nomaziimadouwa "doesn't try to drink." This appears to be a compound involving the verb 惑う madouwa "to get lost, to be perplexed."

==== Participle -te ====
The participle (中止形, chūshikei; lit. "interrupting form," ptcp) is made by adding the suffix -te or -de to the stems of Class 1 (with some allomorphy), -te to those of Class 2, and -kute to verbal adjectives'. For irregular verbs, sjowa becomes site, and kurowa becomes kite. This grammatical form and its cognates across the Japonic languages are known by many names, including "participle," "gerund," "continuative," "subordinating," and simply "te-form"; the term "participle" will be used here. This form descends from the Old Japanese subordinating suffix -te, which was historically added to the infinitive but has gained a great degree of allomorphy due to historical sound changes, so it is treated as its own suffix here.

The participle is a non-finite form that serves a coordinating or subordinating role in sentences, indicating the realization (at the very least, the beginning) of the marked action. Therefore, the clause following a participle must necessarily refer to either the same time or a later time:

icuka nacuga kite koode zjoNzjoumei sukuuroosiga.
icu=ka nacu=ga ki-te koo=de zjoNzjoume=o sukuw-ar-oosi=ga
when=INDET summer=NOM come-PTCP river=LOC loach=ACC scoop-STAT-DUB=but
"Sometime, when summer comes, I'd like to scoop up loaches at the river."

haNzume jamakaa keero tokiN ameni hurarete taiheNdarara.
haNzume jama=kaa keer-o toki=N ame=ni hur-are-te taĭheN=dar-ar-(o=w)a
just.now field=ABL return-ATTR time=DAT rain=DAT fall-PASS-PTCP awful=COP-STAT-ATTR=DECL
"Just now, when I was returning from the fields, I got rained on, and it was awful."

uciwano kazeN aworarete deNpjouga hiNmakara.
uciwa=no kaze=N awor-are-te deNpjou=ga hiQ-mak-ar-(o=w)a
uchiwa=GEN wind=DAT fan-PASS-PTCP payment.slip=NOM INTS-fly-STAT-ATTR=DECL
"When fanned by the wind of the uchiwa, the payment slips flew away."

Due to the temporal ordering implied by the participle, it can be used to imply a causal relationship:

hjaQkokute adaN koide abiroosi.
hjaQko-kute adaN koĭ=de abi-roosi
cold-ADJ.PTCP however this.thing=LOC bathe-DUB
"(This water) is cold, so there's no way I'd bathe in it."

karasumeN torarete tedoreNnaka.
karasume=N tor-are-te tedor-e-Nnak-(o=w)a
crow=DAT take-PASS-PTCP obtain-POT.INF-NEG-ATTR=DECL
"It was taken by crows, so you're not going to be able to get it."

hukurono sokoga naQkede
hukuro=no soko=ga na-ke=de
bag=GEN bottom=NOM not-ADJ.ATTR(NMLZ)=COP.PTCP
"Because the bag has no bottom..."

Lastly, the participle can also be used to mark mirativity or emphasis in verbs of sensation or emotion:

oĩ siNzouga dokidokisite!
oĩ siNzou=ga dokidoki=si-te
wow heart=NOM thumping=do-PTCP
"Oh my, my heart is pounding!"

oĩ sjuuburiga kirete!
oĩ sjuuburi=ga kire-te
wow numbness=NOM be.cut-PTCP
"Ah, (it) has gone numb!"

oĩ kimeiga meite meite!
oĩ kimo-e=ga mei-te mei-te
wow liver-area=NOM burn-PTCP burn-PTCP
"Ugh, I'm so pissed off!"

===== Participle-derived expressions =====
The participle has a few specialized uses when combined with certain particles:

Combination	Japanese cognate	Particles	Example
-tewa -cja	～ては -te wa ～ちゃ -cha	topic -wa	noNdewa ~ noNzja "if one drinks"
-tekara	～てから -te kara	ablative -kara	noNdekara "after drinking"
-temo	～ても -te mo	-mo "also, even"	noNdemo "even if one drinks, even drinking"

Several verbs are also used in common constructions with the participle:

Auxiliary	Class	Independent cognate	Example
-te arowa	1.1A~1.1C	arowa "to be"	noNde arowa "is drinking, has drunk" (Note: Unlike Modern Japanese ～てある -te aru, which has a passive perfect meaning, Hachijō -te arowa expresses a progressive or stative meaning close to Japanese ～ている -te iru.)
-te ikowa	1.1A	ikowa "to go"	noNde ikowa "goes drinking, drinks away, etc."
-te kurowa -te dekurowa	3	(de)kurowa "to come"	noNde kurowa "comes drinking, starts to drink, etc."
-te simouwa	1.1A'd	simouwa "to finish doing"	noNde simouwa "drinks completely, accidentally drinks"
-te mirowa	2a	mirowa "to see"	noNde mirowa "tries to drink"
-te miserowa	2b	miserowa "to show"	noNde miserowa "proves that (he) can drink"
-te miNnaka -te miNzjara	New Neg. 1.1C	mirowa "to see" + Negative	noNde miNnaka "has never drunk"
-tokowa -te okowa	1.1A	okowa "to put"	noNdokowa "drinks (for a later purpose)"

==== Anterior -toQtei ====
The anterior gerund (先行形, senkōkei; ant) can be made by replacing the -te or -de of the participle with -totei ~ -toQtei or -dotei ~ -doQtei, respectively. The form -toQtei ~ doQtei is older, and is now generally used after verbs without euphonic participles (mostly Class 2 and 3 verbs, as well as verbal adjectives), whereas -totei ~ -dotei is used with other verbs (like Class 1 verbs). The copula dara has the anterior gerund doQtei.

There are two likely candidates for this form's etymology:

- participle -te + participle oQte of or- "to be" + accusative -o (in mirative usage)
- participle -te + participle oQte of ok- "to put" + accusative -o (in mirative usage)

This form denotes an action that occurs strictly before another action that occurs in the following clause. It is similar but not exactly equivalent to the construction -tekara ~ -dekara, using the participle -te ~ -de and the ablative -kara.

sono noogee itoo suQtotei, noQte jurerodara.
sono noo=gee ita=o suk-totei nor-te jur-e-ro=dar-(o=w)a
that.ATTR rope=LAT board=ACC lay-ANT ride-PTCP swing-POT-ATTR(NMLZ)=COP-ATTR=DECL
"After laying a board on that rope, you can ride it and swing."

==== Requisitional -tou ====
The requisitional form (依頼, irai; req) form can be made by replacing the -te or -de of the participle with -tou or -dou, respectively. This suffix is often thought to etymologically derive from the participle -te followed by the accusative -o, but as that would have been expected to yield **-tei rather than -tou, this form's ultimate origin is unclear; it likely derives from a more complex contraction.

The requisitional is used for asking favors and requests of others. Like the imperative, it can be softened by adding mii afterward:

kurumee cuNdou.
kuruma=i cum-tou
car=ALL load-REQ
"(Please) load it into the car."

kumacjaN ocjoo cuNdou mii.
kuma-cjaN ocja=o cug-tou mii
bear-DIM tea=ACC pour-REQ please
"Little bear, please pour the tea."

==== Imperative -e ~ -ro ====
The imperative form (命令形, meireikei; imp) is made by adding the suffix -e to the stems of Class 1 verbs, and -ro to those of Class 2. For irregular verbs, sjowa becomes se or sje, and kurowa becomes ko. These forms descend from the Eastern Old Japanese imperative forms -e_{(1)} ~ ro_{2}.

The imperative is used for commands, and can be softened by adding mii afterward:

sorei deeciku hiQkakero.
sore=o deeci-ku hiQkake-ro
that.thing=ACC clean-ADJ.INF drink-IMP
"Drink that cleanly (in one gulp)."

kokei ko mii.
koko=i ko mii
here=ALL come.IMP please
"(Please) come this way."

ozjarijare!
ozjar-i-jar-e
come(HON)-INF-HON-IMP
"Welcome!" or "Please come in!"

The imperative can also be used to warn others about imminent events that would have a negative effect on them:

maN nou sorei nigase!
ma=N nou sore=o nigas-e
now=DAT DM that=ACC let.escape-IMP
"Look, you're gonna let it get away!"

For negative imperatives, the prohibitive postfix -na (attaching to the final form) is used instead.

==== Final form -u ====
The final form (旧終止形, kyū-shūshikei; lit. "old termination form," fin) is made by adding the suffix -u to the stems of Class 1 verbs, nothing or -ru to those of Class 2, and -ke or underlying *-karu to verbal adjectives'. For irregular verbs, sjowa becomes su, and kurowa becomes ku or kuru. However, for Class 1.1C verbs, the underlying *-aru typically contracts to aQ, aN, or oo depending on the following morpheme; the same can be said for verbal adjectives, whose underlying 1.1C *-karu contracts to -kaQ, -kaN, or -koo. This form descends from the Old Japanese final form -u, as well as in some constructions borrowed from Japanese using its attributive form -u ~ -ru.

Despite its name, this suffix's use in concluding declarative sentences has mostly been supplanted in Hachijō by the declarative -owa form. It mainly only exists as a predicative form in quotative and reportative speech:

baa-sama=wa koo=jii seNtaku=N ik-ar-ar-(u) =tew-o=ga
grandma-HON=TOP river=ALL laundry=DAT go-STAT-STAT-FIN =QUOT.say-ATTR=but
"I hear that Grandma went to the river to do laundry, but..."
おばあさんは川へ洗濯に行ったそうだが

bjouki=de ci=no iro=ga koor-ar-(u) =tew-o=wa
illness=LOC blood=GEN color=NOM change-STAT-FIN =QUOT.say-ATTR=DECL
"I hear that his blood changed color when he was sick."
病気で血の色が変わったそうだ。

However, the final form still remains fossilized in the formation of several verbal extensions:

===== Prohibitive -na =====
The prohibitive form (禁止形, kinshikei; proh) is made by adding the suffix -na to the final form (with or without the extra -ru on Class 2 verbs and kurowa). This form is either inherited from the Old Japanese prohibitive -(u)na or reborrowed from Japanese. This form serves as the negative counterpart to the imperative, commanding the addressee not to do something:

sjaku=de mizu=o nom-u-na
ladle=LOC water=ACC drink-FIN-PROH
"Don't drink water with a ladle."
柄杓で水を飲むな。

kokoro-na-ke hito=ni cukaw-are-na
heart-not-ADJ.ATTR person=DAT use-PASS.FIN-PROH
"Don't get used by heartless people."
心ない人に使われるな。

===== Conjectural extension -naw- =====
The conjectural (推量, suiryō; cnjec) extension is made by adding -naw- (Class 1.1A') to the final forms of verbals. On Class 2 verbs and kurowa, the extra ru is optional; for verbal adjectives, the combined result is -kaNnaw-. This extension descends from the Eastern Old Japanese tentative-conjectural suffix -unam- (contrast Western Old Japanese -uram-), with /m/ elided to /w/.

This extension denotes various conjectural meanings such as guessing, expectation, prediction, hypotheticality, and other such irrealis situations.

===== Focalizing extension -naw- =====
The focalizing (強調, kyōchō; lit. "emphatic," foclz) extension is made by adding -naw- (Class 1.1A') to the final forms of verbals, identical in all forms to the conjectural.

This extension was borrowed from a Middle Japanese mermaid construction -(r)u nari, consisting of the Middle Japanese nominalized attributive form in -(r)u followed by the copula なり nari, an exact parallel to Hachijō's native -(r)odara mermaid construction. Because the Middle Japanese attributive is -(r)u rather than -(r)o, this construction was borrowed to use the Hachijō final form in -(r)u instead. In addition, the borrowed copula nar- has been reduced to -naw-, merging in form with the conjectural -naw-.

The Japanese-style present form -nou (← -naw-u) is used sentence-finally for emphasis (example 1) and sentence-medially express cause and effect (example 2):

ikura a=ga cukur-jaatei uĭ=ga ki-te kore=o kous-u-naw-u
how.many me=NOM make-FHYP that.person=NOM come-PTCP this=ACC destroy-FIN-FOCLZ-JPRS
"No matter how many I make, that person will come and destroy them."
いくら私が作っても、あいつが来てこれを壊すんだもの。

uĭ=ga nom-u-naw-u aĭ=mo hosi-ku nar-o =da(r)-o=zja
that.person=NOM drink-FIN-FOCLZ-JPRS me=also wanting-INF become-ATTR(NMLZ) =COP-ATTR=DECL
"That person will drink, so I will want some, too."
あの人が飲むから、私も欲しくなるんだよ。

The exclamatory form -nee (← -naw-e) is used in kakari-musubi with the focus particle koo (see the section on focalized exclamatory kakari-musubi for details and examples).

The provisional form -neeja (← -naw-eba) is used to express two types of conditionals or cause-and-effect statements. When not following the stative extension, it is an imperfect conditional, indicating that the condition was met repeatedly or many times at once:

terebi=o mi-naw-e(b)a ure=N waĭkjuw-are-tar-(o=w)a
television=ACC see.FIN-FOCLZ-PROV that.person=DAT scold-PASS-STAT-ATTR=DECL
"Whenever I watched television, I was scolded by that person." (repeated instances)
テレビを見ていると、あの人に怒られた。

konasama=ga marub-u-naw-e(b)a jakekuso=N nar-te haa kabee=jo=mo mog-i-Nnak-(o=w)a
silkworm=NOM die-FIN-FOCLZ-PROV desperate=DAT become-PTCP already mulberry.leaf=ACC=even pluck-INF-NEG-ATTR=DECL
"When the silkworms started dying (one after another), he became desperate and wouldn't pick any more mulberry leaves." (many instances at once)
蚕が（つぎつぎ）死んでいくと、（それが原因でこの人は）ヤケクソになって、もう桑の葉をも、捥がないよ。

When -neeja does follow the stative extension, the clauses expresses a completed action, and the following clause indicates a result that occurred upon its completion:

uku=i nubur-ar-(u)-naw-e(b)a mei-tar-(o=w)a
there=ALL climb-STAT-FIN-FOCLZ-PROV be.visible-STAT-ATTR=DECL
"When (I) climbed up there, (it) was visible."
あそこへ上ったら見えた。

Lastly, this extension appears to be somehow fossilized in the optative ending -osunou.

===== Jussive Adjective -beki =====
The jussive (当為・義務, tōi-gimu; lit. "responsibility & duty," juss) is made by adding the postfix -beki to the final forms of verbs, creating an adjectival noun. This form is borrowed from the Japanese form -beki, descended from Western Old Japanese -(u)be_{2}-ki_{1}.

This form acts as an adjectival noun that, when used with the copula dara, expresses a meaning like "ought to do," "should do," or "needs to do":

waĭ=mo ik-u-beki =dar-a(r)-o =ni
me=also go-FIN-JUSS =COP-STAT-ATTR(NMLZ) =COP.INF
"Even though I should have gone too..."
私も行くべきだったのに

A verbal adjective form -bekja of this affix has also been attested.

===== Suppositional adjective -rasikja =====
The suppositional (推定, suitei; supp) form is made by adding the extension -rasi- to the final forms of verbs, creating a verbal adjective. This form is either inherited from Eastern Old Japanese -(u)rasi or borrowed from its Japanese cognate form ～らしい -rashi-i.

This form is a verbal adjective with the meaning "seeming":

asu=mo juki=ga hur-u-rasi-ke=(w)a
tomorrow=also snow=NOM fall-FIN-SUPP-ADJ.ATTR=DECL
"It seems it will snow tomorrow, too."
明日も雪が降るらしい。

==== Conditional gerund -aba ====
The conditional gerund (aba条件形, ABA jōkenkei; lit. "aba-conditional form," cond) is made by adding the suffix -aba to the stems of Class 1 verbs, -ba or -raba to those of Class 2, and -kaba or -kaaba ~ -karaba to verbal adjectives'. For irregular verbs, sjowa becomes saba, and kurowa becomes koba or kuraba. This form descends from the Old Japanese conditional gerund -aba.

This form introduces a condition or prerequisite that, if it is (or were) true, the following clause occurs (or would occur). For conditions without a stative, the consequence occurs before the condition (in anticipation of it):

koko=N ne-ba hutoN=jo suk-o=wa
here=DAT sleep-COND futon=ACC lay.out-ATTR=DECL
"If (he) is going to sleep here, then (I) will lay out a futon (beforehand)," or
"If (he) were to sleep here, then (I) would lay out a futon (beforehand)."
ここに寝るなら、布団を敷くよ。

unu=mo ik-aba kore=o mot-te ik-e
you=also go-COND this=ACC hold-PTCP go-IMP
"If you're going too, take this with you (before you go)."
おまえも行くなら、これを持っていけ。

For past conditions (usually marked with a stative), the consequence occurs after the achievement of the condition:

hama=i ik-a(r)-aba keegou=jo hirow-te ko jou
beach=ALL go-STAT-COND seashell=ACC pick.up-PTCP come.IMP DM
"If you go to the beach, bring back a seashell (afterwards)."
浜に行ったら、貝を拾ってこいと。

Finally, if the consequence refers to past time, the sentence is always counterfactual, where the condition was not actually met:

unu=mo ik-aba cur-te ik-oosita(r)-o =ni
you=also go-COND join-PTCP go-PSTSUBJ-ATTR(NMLZ) =COP.INF
"If you were going to go too, I would've gone with you, but..."
おまえも行くなら、連れて行ったのに。

haĭ-ku keer-a(r)-aba jo-kar-ar-(o=w)a
soon-ADJ.INF go.home-STAT-COND good-ADJ-STAT-ATTR=DECL
"It would have been better if you had come home early."
はやく帰ればよかった。

==== Futile-hypothetical gerund -jaatei ====
The futile-hypothetical gerund (逆条件形, gyaku-jōkenkei; lit. "reverse-conditional form," fhyp) is made by adding the suffix -jaatei to the stems of Class 1 verbs, -rjaatei to those of Class 2, and -kjaatei or -karjaatei to verbal adjectives'. For irregular verbs, sjowa becomes sjaatei, and kurowa becomes kurjaatei. This form is believed to descend from the Class 1 infinitive -i followed by the phrase aQte mo "even if it is": *-iaQtemo → *-jaQtewo → *-jaatei; the other verb classes' forms must have been formed by analogy.

This form expresses futility: the clause marked by -jaatei introduces a condition that is known to be false or impossible, and the following clause expresses an action or state that would remain true even if the condition were met.

ure=N iw-jaatei kik-i-Nnak-(o=w)a
that.person=DAT say-FHYP hear-INF-NEG-ATTR=DECL
"Even if (you) tell that person, he won't listen," or "...he won't hear it."
あいつに言っても、聞かないよ。

ikura nom-jaatei jow-i-Nar-(u)-naw-o=wa
how.much drink-FHYP get.drunk-INF-NEG-FIN-CNJEC-ATTR=DECL
"I probably won't get drunk no matter how much I drink."
いくら飲んでも酔わないだろうよ。

==== Exclamatory -e ====
The exclamatory form (已然形, izenkei; excl) is made by adding the suffix -e to the stems of Class 1 verbs, -re to those of Class 2, and -ke to verbal adjectives'. For irregular verbs, sjowa becomes se or sje, and kurowa becomes kure. This form descends from the Old Japanese exclamatory form -e_{2} ~ -ure.

The exclamatory form used as a predicative form in constructions with the focus particles ka and koo; these constructions are detailed further in the section on kakari-musubi. The exclamatory form is also used etymologically as the base for forming the provisional and concessive gerunds, detailed in the following subsection:

===== Provisional -eba ~ -ja =====
The provisional gerund (eba条件形, EBA jōkenkei; lit. "eba-conditional form," prov) is generally formed by adding by the suffix -ba or -a to the exclamatory form of verbals (but is treated as its own suffix). For the -a variant, this contracts with a preceding e to become ja, or if the verb's exclamatory form ends in a long vowel, -a becomes -ja instead (e.g., wareeba → wareeja "when he laughs"). For verbal adjectives, the -ba forms are -keba and -kereba, while the -a form is -kerja. For the irregular verb sjowa, the -ba forms are sureba and s(j)eba, and the -a forms are surja and sja. For the irregular verb kurowa, the -ba form is kureba, and the -a form is -kurja. All of these forms descend from the Old Japanese conjunctive gerund -e_{2}ba ~ -ureba with or without the /b/ elided. Although the variants in -eba and -ja have identical etymologies, they have slightly diverged in usage.

The principal function of the provisional gerund is to mark a subordinate clause that is causally or temporally related to the main clause, describing the circumstance in which the main clause occurs:

kore=o nom-e(b)a daĭ =de=mo jow-o=wa
this=ACC drink-PROV who =COP.PTCP=even get.drunk-ATTR=DECL
"Anyone would get drunk if/when they drank this."
これを飲めばだれでも酔うよ。

aki=N nar-e(b)a kaNmo=ga kam-e-ro=wa
autumn=DAT become-PROV sweet.potato=NOM eat-POT-ATTR=DECL
"(We) can eat sweet potatoes when autumn comes."
秋になればサツマイモが食べられるよ。

Both -eba and -ja can also be used to mark future conditions, whether they are expected to be actualized or not:

sogo͡oN sj-eba ki=ga hare-ro=wa
in.that.way do-PROV feeling=NOM become.clear-ATTR=DECL
"If you do that, you'll feel better," or "If you did that, you'd feel better."
そうすれば気が晴れるよ。

kore=o nom-e(b)a koĭ=ga soog-o=wa
this=ACC drink-PROV this.person=NOM get.angry-ATTR=DECL
"If you drink this, this person will get angry," or "If you drank this, this person would get angry."
これを飲めばこの人が怒るよ。

However, for conditions or circumstances that are or were met repeatedly, with the same result in each case, -ja is preferred for both present and past results:

a=ga utaw-e(b)a koĭ=ga tome-ro=wa
me=NOM sing-PROV this.person=NOM stop-ATTR=DECL
"Whenever I sing, this person stops me."
私が歌っていると、こいつが止める。

uĭ=ga kam-e(b)a aĭ=mo hosi-ku nar-ar-(o=w)a
that.person=NOM eat-PROV me=also wanting-ADJ.INF become-STAT-ATTR=DECL
"Whenever that person was eating, I wanted some, too."
あの人が食べていると、私も欲しくなった。

When used with a focus-marking particle ka or koo, a provisional in -ja marks a precise reason, with more emphasis than the common phrasing using -Nte "because." Naturally, such sentences with ka or koo use exclamatory kakari-musubi:

a=ga cukaw-e(b)a=koo mot-te ki-tar-(u)-naw-e
me=NOM use-PROV=FOC hold-PTCP come-STAT-FIN-FOCLZ-EXCL
"It is because I will use it that I have started holding it."
私が使うからこそ持ってきたんだよ。

===== Concessive -edou =====
The concessive gerund (dou接続形, DOU setsuzokukei; lit. "dou-conjunctional form," cnces) is formed by adding by the suffix -dou to the exclamatory form of verbals (but is treated as its own suffix). For Class 1.1C verbs, the resulting sequence -aredou can contract to -aĭdou. This form descends from the Old Japanese concessive gerund -e_{2}do_{2}mo_{2} ~ -uredo_{2}mo_{2} → -edowo ~ -redowo → -edou ~ -redou, cognate to the Japanese conjunctions けども kedomo and けれども keredomo "although." The forms -doumo and -douni are also attested.

The concessive gerund introduces adverse information despite which the main clause still nevertheless occurs or occurred:

kinei=wa hur-ci-dou kei=wa ada =da=ka
yesterday=TOP rain-RET(EXCL)-CNCES today=TOP how =COP.JPRS=Q
"Although it rained yesterday, how will today be, I wonder?"
昨日は（雨が）降ったが、今日はどうだか。

==== Volitional -ou ====
The volitional form (意志形, ishikei; vol) is made by adding the suffix -ou to the stems of Class 1 verbs, and -rou to those of Class 2. Alternative formations also exist, where Class 1.1A' verbs use their declarative or final form, -i (possibly underlying *o or *u) is attached to the stems of Class 2b verbs, and nothing is added to the stems of Classes 2c and 2d. For irregular verbs, sjowa becomes sjou, and kurowa becomes kurou or kou. (Verbal adjectives have no volitional form.) The volitional seems to have some relationship to the Old Japanese tentative-conjectural form -am-, and thereby the Japanese volitional -ō ~ -yō, but the exact path between the Old Japanese and Modern Hachijō forms is not clear.

The volitional indicates a personal intent or a cohortative suggestion:

sorosoro ne-rou
before.long sleep-VOL
"It's about time (we) went to sleep," or "Let's go to sleep soon."
そろそろ寝よう。

aĭ=mo nom-ou
me=also drink-VOL
"I'll drink, too."
私も飲もう。

Statements of intent can be emphasized by adding the postfix -bei, as in nomoubei "I'll drink!" Similarly, cohortative suggestions can be emphasized by adding the declarative particle -zja, as in ikouzja "Let's go!"

The volitional can also be used as an attributive form in the construction -ou houdara and its negative equivalent -ou hou nakja, which indicate ability or possibility:

ur(e=w)a jom-ou hou =da(r)-o=(N)te ure=o tanom-e
that.person=TOP read-VOL(ATTR) way =COP-ATTR=because that.person=ACC request-IMP
"That person can read (it), so ask him."
あの人は読めるから、あの人を頼め。

jase-i hou na-ke=(w)a
lose.weight-VOL(ATTR) way not-ADJ.ATTR=DECL
"I am unable to lose weight."
痩せることができない。

===== Simultaneous -outei =====
The simultaneous gerund (同時形, dōjikei; simul) can be made by appending -tei to the end of the volitional form. There are two likely candidates for this form's etymology:

- volitional -ou + quotative te + accusative -o (in mirative usage)
- volitional -ou + quotative to + allative -i

This form denotes an action that occurs simultaneously with another action, similar to English "while ~ing," and equivalent in meaning to adding -nagara "while" to the infinitive.

teeko=o hatak-ou-tei utaw-te mi-ro
drum=ACC beat-VOL-SIMUL sing-PTCP see-IMP
"Try singing and playing the drums at the same time."
太鼓を叩きながら歌ってみろ。

This sense of simultaneity can also be used to indicate an action that was interrupted by another:

isi=o horow-(ou)-tei bukacuk-ar-(o=w)a
rock=ACC pick.up-VOL-SIMUL fall.forward-STAT-ATTR=DECL
"He fell forward while trying to pick up a rock."
石を拾おうとして前に転んだ。

It can also be used to emphasize a contradictory yet simultaneous event:

waraw-te ar-ou-tei waraw-i-(N)nak-(o=w)a =te iw-o=wa
laugh-PTCP be-VOL-SIMUL laugh-INF-NEG-ATTR=DECL =QUOT say-ATTR=DECL
"He says "I'm not laughing!" (even) while laughing."
笑っていながら、「笑わない（笑っていない）よ」と言う。

==== Dubitative-related forms ====
Several verbal forms appear to be related to the dubitative (formerly optative) form listed below, which seems to be related in some way to the Classical Japanese optative constructions ～ま欲しき -mafosi-ki or ～ま欲りする -mafori suru.

===== Dubitative -oosi =====
The dubitative (反語, hango; lit. "ironic," dub) form is made by adding the suffix -oosi to the stems of Class 1 verbs (or -aroosi for Class 1.1A'), -isi or -roosi to those of Class 2a and 2b, -si or -roosi to those of Class 2c and 2d, and -karoosi to verbal adjectives'. For irregular verbs, sjowa becomes seisi or sjoosi, and kurowa becomes kousi or kuroosi. The Sueyoshi and Aogashima dialects are an exception, where -iisi is used for Class 1 verbs (-ariisi for Class 1.1A'), only -isi ~ -si is used for Class 2, sjowa becomes siisi, and kurowa becomes kiisi.

As attested in older records, this form once expressed an optative meaning, often (but not necessarily) regarding a wish or hope that the speaker thinks might not come true:

(u)n(u)=ga icu=ka ko-osi=ga
you=NOM when=INDET come-DUB=but
"I'd like for you to come again sometime."
おまえがいつか（また）来るといいなあ。

icu=ka nacu=ga ki-te koo=de zjoNzjoume=o sukuw-ar-oosi=ga
when=INDET summer=NOM come-PTCP river=LOC loach=ACC scoop-STAT-DUB=but
"Sometime, when summer comes, I'd like to scoop up loaches at the river."
いつか夏が来て川でドジョウを掬いたいなあ。

icu=ka ura=ga huuhu=N nar-oosi=ga
when=INDET they=NOM husband.and.wife=DAT become-DUB=but
"It would be nice if they became a married couple."
いつ彼らは夫婦になるかなあ。（夫婦になるのは楽しみだなあ。）

However, due to semantic shift emphasizing the non-realization of the wish, this form has changed to have an ironic, doubting, or generally negative meaning in modern speech. When used with a first-person subject, it expresses what the speaker does not want to do, cannot do, or does not believe he or she can do. When used with non-first-person subjects, it expresses what the speaker expects is not the case or will not happen.

adaN nare=to nom-e-isi
however you(OFNS)=COM drink-POT-DUB
"There's no way I could ever drink with you."
どうもおまえとは飲めない

hjaQko-kute adaN koĭ=de abi-isi/roosi
cold-ADJ.PTCP however this.thing=LOC bathe-DUB
"(This water) is cold, so there's no way I'd bathe in it."
（水が）冷たくてどうもこれで浴びられない。

mou wa=ga iku-nen iki-isi/roosi
anymore me=NOM how.many-year live-DUB
"I doubt that I'll live for many more years."
もう私が何年生きるだろう。（もうそんなに生きられない。）

ure=N nou kik-jaatei osei-te ke-isi
that.person=DAT DM ask-FHYP teach-PTCP give-DUB
"As for that guy, he wouldn't tell you even if you asked him."
あいつにね、聞いても教えてくれるものか。

kono ziki=ni hotour-oosi
this.ATTR time.period=DAT be.hot-DUB
"It's not like it's hot in this season."
この時期に暑いわけないよ。

The dubitative can also attach to the negative infinitive -zu to form -ziisi, which—due to its double negative-like meaning—indicates what the speaker thinks should be possible or doesn't doubt will happen.

aNde sore=o nom-izu-isi
why that=ACC drink-NEG.INF-DUB
"There's no reason why he wouldn't drink that."
なんでそれを飲まないものか。

un(u-r)a=N=see deki-ro mono=o aNde ware=N deki-zu-isi
that.person-PL=DAT=even be.able-ATTR thing=ACC why me=DAT be.able-NEG.INF-DUB
"If even those people can do it, there's no reason why I shouldn't be able to."
おまえたちにさえできるものを、どうして私にできないものか。

This is identical in meaning to the forms -Nnakaroosi and Nzjaroosi, which use the negative auxiliaries -Nnaka and -Nzjara.

===== Optative -oosunou =====
The optative (希望, kibō; opt) form is made by replacing the -si of the dubitative form with -sunou (but is treated as its own suffix). This form appears to consist of the dubitative followed by the focalizing extension -naw- in its Japanese-style present form -nou.

Like the older use of -osi, -osunou expresses an optative meaning, often regarding a wish or hope that the speaker thinks might not come true. Kaneda (2001) notes that the older meaning of optative -osi and the modern meaning of -osunou are largely the same with subtle differences, but does not elaborate further.

uku=de hara-iQpee kam-oosunou
there=LOC belly-full eat-OPT
"I'd like to eat there (until my) belly (is) full."
あそこで腹いっぱい食べたいなあ。

nizjuugoNci=ga icu=ka ko-osunou
twenty.fifth.day=NOM when=INDET come-OPT
"The 25th day (of this month) can't come soon enough," or "I wish the 25th could come faster."
２５日がはやく来ないかなあ。

===== Intentional -oosjaate =====
The intentional (意図, ito; inten) gerund is made by replacing the -si of the dubitative form with -sjaate (but is treated as its own suffix).

This form is generally indicate that an action is attempted, considered, to planned to be done:

ato=de kam-oosjaate ok-a(r)-o=jo dare=N=ka kam-are-tar-(o=w)a
afterward=LOC eat-INTEN leave-STAT-ATTR(NMLZ)=ACC who=DAT=INDET eat-PASS-STAT-ATTR=DECL
"Somebody ate (the food) that I had left out and had intended to eat later."
後で食べようと置いておいたのを誰かに食べられた。

The intentional is often used in conjunction with the verb sjowa "to do." With agentive verbs, this construction means "to attempt to, to plan to," etc., whereas with non-agentive verbs, it instead means "to seem to be about to":

ko-osjaate s-jaatei k-ou hou na-ke =dar-(o=w)a
come-INTEN do-FHYP come-VOL way not-ADJ.ATTR(NMLZ) =COP-ATTR=DECL
"No matter how (much) I try to come, I cannot come (because I have bad legs)."
来ようとしても来られないのだ。（足が悪くて）

wak-oosjaate si-te ar-(o=w)a
boil-INTEN do-PTCP be-ATTR=DECL
"(The pot) seems like it's about to boil."
（ナベが）沸きかかっている。

===== Past subjunctive -oositar- =====
The past subjunctive (局面に関わる派生形式, kyokumen ni kakawaru hasei-keishiki; lit. "derived form concerning circumstance," pstsubj) is made by replacing the -si of the dubitative form with -sitara (but is treated as its own suffix), which is conjugated as a Class 1.1C verb (stem -sitar-). This form appears to etymologically consist of the dubitative followed by the stative suffix -tar-.

This form is used to mark actions that would have occurred in different circumstances, but were not (or could not be) actualized:

ma=N =da=to=wa terebi=N maĭnici housou =s-are-isitar-(u)-naw-o=wa
now=DAT =COP.JPRS=if=TOP television=DAT every.day broadcasting =do-PASS-PSTSUBJ-FIN-CNJEC-ATTR=DECL
"It probably would have been broadcast on TV every day now."
今だとテレビに毎日、放送されるところだったろうよ。

==== Japanese-style forms ====
All of these forms have been borrowed directly from Modern or Late Middle Japanese, but are nativized to lesser or greater extent. In many constructions, Japanese-style tenses are capable of replacing final and/or attributive forms. Generally, the Japanese-style present and Japanese-style past are equivalent to Hachijō-style forms with and without the stative suffix -(t)ar-, respectively.

===== Present -u =====
The affirmative Japanese-style present (ノム形, NOMU kei; lit. "nomu form," jprs) is made by adding the suffix -u to the stems of Class 1 verbs, -ru to those of Class 2, and a coalescing -i to verbal adjectives'. For irregular verbs, sjowa becomes su or suru, and kurowa becomes ku or kuru. The copula dara also has the irregular form da.
The negative Japanese-style present has two forms; the first is made by changing the New-Type Negative auxiliary -Nnaka to -Nnee, while the second is formed by changing the -ba of the conditional gerund -aba to -nee.

===== Past -ta =====
The affirmative Japanese-style past (ノンダ形, NONDA kei; lit. "nonda form," jpst) is made by changing the -te or -de of verbs' participles to -ta or -da, respectively, and by adding -kaQta to verbal adjectives' stems. For verbs, this can be further extended by adding another -Qta to the end, with a meaning akin to adding a second past -(t)ar- to a verb.
The negative Japanese-style past is made by changing the New-Type Negative auxiliary -Nnaka of the negative Japanese-style present tense to -NnaQta.

Despite being a Japanese-borrowed form, Class 1 verbs still exhibit Hachijō-style euphony as in the participle form; for example, the Japanese-style past form of togowa "to grind, polish" (stem tog-) is toNda, not **toida.

===== Presumptive -darou ~ -rou =====
The Japanese-style presumptive (推量, suiryō; prsm) forms are made by appending -darou to Japanese-style present tense verbals, or -rou to Japanese-style past tense verbals. On verbs, the negative present presumptive also has a suppletive form where -mee is appended to the final form. These forms were borrowed from the Japanese presumptive particle だろう darō (a combination of the copula だ da and suffix ～ろう -rō) and the suffixes ～ろう -rō and ～まい -mai. The latter are descended from the Early Middle Japanese suffixes ～らむ -ramu ~ -raũ and ～まじ -mazi.

This form is generally equivalent in meaning to the native Hachijō conjectural extension -naw-.

===== Representative -tari =====
The Japanese-style representative (並列, heiretsukei; lit. "parallel," jrep) gerund is made by adding -ri or -ĭ to the Japanese-style past tense (but is treated as its own suffix). This creates a gerund meaning "activities such as ~ing," and it is often used in non-exhaustive lists of activities. These forms were borrowed from the equivalent Japanese forms -tari ~ -dari.

This gerund is usually paired with a verb of doing usually sjowa "to do" (but also occasionally, others, such as simouwa "to finish doing"):

cjawaN=jo araw-tari imo=o kokur-tari kome=o tog-tari si-ta(r)-o tokoro
bowl=ACC clean-JREP taro=ACC scrape-JREP rice=o polish-JREP do-STAT-ATTR place
"the place where we did things like cleaning bowls, peeling taros, and washing rice"
茶碗を洗ったり、サトイモの皮を剥いたり、米を米を磨いだりした場所

The auxiliary verb -mik- differs in that it cannot mark lists of activities, only a single activity.

==== Verbal adjective nominalizers -sa and -mi ====
Two unique ways to change verbal adjectives into nouns is by using the affixes -sa and -mi (both adj.nmlz), both of which are attached directly to the verbal adjective stem. Unlike in Japanese, Hachijō -mi is synonymous with -sa and indicates a noun of extent or quantity, comparable to English -ness:

kono taka-mi=ga jo-ke=(w)a
this.ATTR high-ADJ.NMLZ=NOM good-ADJ.ATTR=DECL
"This height is fine."
この高さがいいよ。

kono seba-sa =da(r)-o toko=o
this.ATTR narrow-ADJ.NMLZ =COP-ATTR place=ACC
"a place of this narrowness"
この狭さのところを／このぐらい狭いところを

The suffix -mi can only be used with a select number of verbal adjectives, whereas -sa can be used with all verbal adjectives.

==== Negative ====
There are a variety of ways to form negative (否定, hiteikei) verbs—that is, verbs with the meaning "not" included—in Hachijō. The primary ways are with auxiliary verbs, of which Hachijō has two: the "Old-Type" -Nzjara and the "New-Type" -Nnaka. It has been said that the Old-Type is typical of the Uphill region of Hachijō-jima (in the Kashitate, Nakanogō, and Sueyoshi dialects), whereas the New-Type is typical of the Downhill region (Mitsune and Ōkagō dialects); however, the New-Type has spread to be used among all younger generations of speakers. Verbal adjectives and the copula do not use either of these negative auxiliaries. Instead, verbal adjectives use their infinitive form in -ku followed by the verbal adjective nakja "not"; similarly, the copula uses zja nakja—the participle form de fused with the topic marker -wa, followed by nakja.

===== Old-type negative -Nzjara =====
The Old-Type negative (古いタイプ否定, furui taipu hitei; neg) is formed by adding the auxiliary verb -Nzjara (stem -Nzjar-, Class 1.1C) to a verb's infinitive form. If the verb's infinitive ends in a long vowel, the first N of this auxiliary is dropped.

It is speculated that -Nzjar- may come from an unattested Eastern Old Japanese construction *-ni si ar- "is not doing," composed the negative infinitive -(a)ni, infinitive si of s- "to do," and ar- "to be." This would be akin to how early Old Japanese -ni su yielded later -zu "does not."

===== New-type negative -Nnaka =====
The New-Type negative (新しいタイプ否定, atarashii taipu hitei; neg) is formed by adding the auxiliary verb -Nnaka (stem -Nnak- ~ -Nnar- ~ -Nnakar-, special conjugation class) to a verb's infinitive form. If the verb's infinitive ends in a long vowel, the first N of this auxiliary is dropped. It is speculated that the New-Type negative is based on replacing the zjara of the Old-Type negative -Nzjara with the adjective nakja "not," then reanalyzing it as something akin to a Class 1.1C verb. This would explain the alternating verb stems:

- -Nnakar- would be the regular derived Class 1.1C verb stem of *-Nnakja: *-Nna-ku ar- → -Nnakar-.
- -Nnak- would be from changing *-Nnakja to a verb *-Nnakowa → -Nnaka.
- -Nnar- would be from replacing the zj of -Nzjara with n by analogy: -Nzjar- → -Nnar-.

As this auxiliary is highly irregular, a sample of conjugated forms is given in the table below:

Verb form	Basic (present)	Stative (past)
Attributive	Nnoo; Nnako	Nn(ak)aroo
wa-declarative	Nnaka	Nn(ak)arara
Final	*Nnaru	*Nn(ak)araru
Conjectural	NnaNnouwa	Nn(ak)araNnouwa
Japanese-style	Nnee	NnaQta
Exclamatory	Nnare	Nn(ak)arare
Focalized exclamatory	NnaNnee	Nn(ak)araNnee
Participle	Nsjade	
Conditional	Nn(ak)aaba	Nn(ak)araaba
Provisional	Nn(ak)areba	Nn(ak)arareba
Futile-hypothetical	Nnakjaatei	Nn(ak)arjaatei

===== Other negative forms =====
In addition to the negative auxiliaries, there are also several other verbal affixes that indicate negative meaning:

- Negative infinitive -zu (neg.inf), and all of its derived forms.
- Prohibitive -na (proh), a postfix following the final form, which serves as the negative counterpart to the imperative.
- Japanese-style negative present -anee (neg.jprs), which is one of the Japanese-style counterparts to the normal present tense. It can be formed by replacing the -zu of the -azu form of the negative infinitive with -nee, e.g., nomanee "doesn't drink."
- Japanese-style negative present presumptive -mee (neg.jprs.prsm), a postfix following the final form, which serves as the negative counterpart to -darou.

==== Stative -ar- ~ -tar- ====
The stative (アリ形, ARI kei; lit. "ari-form," stat) derivation is made by adding -ar- to the stems of Class 1.1 and 1.2 verbs, -(i)tar- to those of Class 1.3 (with some allomorphy), -tar- to those of Class 2, and -karar- to verbal adjectives'. For irregular verbs, sjowa becomes sitar-, and kurowa becomes kitar-. All stative forms are conjugated as Class 1.1C verbs. The allomorph -ar- descends from the Eastern Old Japanese stative-progressive -ar-, itself a construction from the Pre-Old Japanese infinitive *-i + ar- "to be"; it is therefore cognate to Western Old Japanese -e_{1}r- and Middle Japanese -er- of the same original meaning (extinct in Modern Japanese). The allomorphs containing -tar- instead descend from the Old Japanese stative-progressive -tar-, consisting of participle -te + ar- "to be"; it is therefore cognate to the Modern Japanese past tense -ta.

Although originally indicating stative-like meaning, and continuing to do so in some situations, this extension has changed to a meaning close to a past tense in modern Hachijō, supplanting the former past tense (now retrospective) -ci in most cases.

Due to heavy influence from Japanese, for some speakers, forms with the morph -ar- are in the process of being replaced with forms in -tar- ~ -dar- (formed in the same way as the participle -te ~ -de): nomara → noNdara "drank," ikara → iQtara "went," curara → cuQtara "fished."

==== Retrospective -ci ====
The retrospective (過去キ, kako KI; lit. "past-ki," ret) is made by replacing the -te or -de of the participle with -ci or -zi, respectively. It is often used in combination with the stative -(t)ar-, as -(t)aQci, to express more or less the same meaning. The retrospective can also combine with the Japanese-style past -ta to form -taQci, or with both the Japanese-style past -ta and the stative -ar- to form -taraQci.

This form descends from the attributive form -si of the Old Japanese past tense auxiliary -ki_{1}. It is believed to have been changed from -si to -ci by morphological leveling due to Class 1.1A verbs' stem-final Q, as per the phonological process Q-s → Qc.

This extension indicates past tense, as well as often indicating a modal meaning of retrospection or recollection. Although it does not inflect per se, -ci can be treated as an attributive, exclamatory, or final form. As an attributive form, it can be used in all normal attributive-form functions:

uku=N sak-ar-ci=o tor-azu=N cir-a(s)e-(te) simaw-ar-a(r)-o=zja
there=DAT bloom-STAT-RET(ATTR,NMLZ)=ACC take-NEG.INF=DAT scatter-CAUS-(PTCP) finish-STAT-STAT-ATTR=DECL
"You didn't pick what had bloomed there; you just let them scatter, right?" (nominalized)
あそこに咲いたのを採らずに散らせてしまったね。

uku=N ar-ar-ci hito=wa adaN nar-te ar-u-darou
there=DAT be-STAT-RET(ATTR) person=TOP in.what.way become-PTCP be-JPRS-PRSM
"What happened to the person who was there?" (adnominal)
あそこにいた人はどうしているだろう。

uno-toki=mo nom-ar-ci=kaN
that.ATTR-time=also drink-STAT-RET(ATTR)=Q
"Did I drink at that time, too...?" (interrogative kakari-musubi)
あの時も飲んだんだっけ？

uno-toki NNma-sou =ni nom-ci=Nte joQpodo suki =de=ka ar-(u)-naw-o
that.ATTR-time delicious-seeming =COP.INF drink-RET(ATTR)=because greatly liking =COP.PTCP=Q be-FIN-CNJEC-ATTR
"Since he drank it like it was delicious, he must like really it." (with a conjunction particle)
あのとき美味そうに飲んだから、よほど好きなんだろう。

However, the declarative form with -wa is irregular, becoming -cii ~ -zii:

uku=de uĭ=to nom-ar-ci=(wa)
that.place=LOC that.person=COM drink-STAT-RET(ATTR)=DECL
"(As I recall,) that person did drink at that place."
あそこで、あの人と飲んだっけなあ。

As a final form, -ci combines with the focalized exclamatory -nee for kakari-musubi with the focus particle koo. Such sentences are used to emphatically remind others of past events that they have forgotten:

uku=de=koo nom-ci-naw-e
that.place=LOC=FOC drink-RET(FIN)-FOCLZ-EXCL
"(Surely,) that was where you drank it, (was it not?)"
（まさに）あそこでコソ飲んだじゃない！

Lastly, as an exclamatory-type form, -ci can serve as the base for the concessive gerund -dou:

kinei=wa hur-ci-dou kei=wa ada =da=ka
yesterday=TOP rain-RET(EXCL)-CNCES today=TOP how =COP.JPRS=Q
"Although it rained yesterday, how will today be, I wonder?"
昨日は（雨が）降ったが、今日はどうだか。

This affix is falling out of use, having mostly been supplanted in meaning by the stative, which has transitioned into a past-like meaning. However, it still contrasts with the stative in that the retrospective requires an action to have occurred significantly in the past. For example, sentence 8 is acceptable, whereas sentence 9 is not:

ma=N ki-ta(r)-o hito=wa koĭ =dar-(o=w)a
now=DAT come-STAT-ATTR person=TOP this.person =COP-ATTR=DECL
"This person is the one who just arrived."
今来た人はこの人だ。

ma=N ki-tar-ci hito=wa koĭ =dar-(o=w)a
now=DAT come-STAT-RET(ATTR) person=TOP this.person =COP-ATTR=DECL
Intended meaning: "This person is the one who just arrived."
今来た人はこの人だ。

Because the person in the above examples still remains present in when the sentence is uttered, the action of "arriving" is not significantly past enough for the retrospective (in 9) to be appropriate, but the simple stative (in 8) is acceptable.

==== Passive -(r)are- ====
The "passive" (受動, judō; pass) extension is made by adding the suffix -are- to the stems of Class 1 verbs, and -rare- to those of Class 2. For irregular verbs, sjowa becomes sare-, and kurowa becomes korare-. All passive forms are conjugated as Class 2b verbs.

The primary function of the passive is to denote an action that occurs without the intent or volition of the subject of the sentence. In this usage, the recipient or "affected party" of the action becomes the subject (marked as a topic or in nominative case, or omitted), and any agent is marked in the dative case with N~ni:

ar(e=w)a kanasi-ke terebi=o mi-ru=to sugu benar-are
me=TOP sad-ADJ.ATTR television=ACC see-JPRS=if soon cry-PASS.INF
"Whenever I watch a sad television show, I quickly start crying."
私は悲しいテレビを見ると、すぐ泣けてくる。

A specialized use of this is to form passive sentences. In some situations, these can be interpreted as a direct passive similar to English's, where the former direct object becomes the new subject of the sentence as the "affected party":

kore=o nom-e(b)a soog-are-ro=wa
this=ACC drink-PROV scold-PASS-ATTR=DECL
"If you drink this, you will be scolded."
これを飲めば怒られるよ。

uciwa=no kaze=N awor-are-te deNpjou=ga hiQ-mak-ar-(o=w)a
uchiwa=GEN wind=DAT fan-PASS-PTCP payment.slip=NOM INTS-fly-STAT-ATTR=DECL
"When fanned by the wind of the uchiwa, the payment slips flew away."
ウチワの風に扇がれて、伝票が飛んでいった。

karasume=N tor-are-te tedor-e-Nnak-(o=w)a
crow=DAT take-PASS-PTCP obtain-POT.INF-NEG-ATTR=DECL
"It was taken by crows, so you're not going to be able to get it."
カラスに取られて手には入れられないよ。

In other situations, the "affected party" is not the former direct object, creating passive sentences that often cannot be directly translated with the English passive voice. Such usages are sometimes termed the "suffering passive" (迷惑の受身, meiwaku no ukemi), as the Hachijō subject is often a person who suffers as a result of the action. As Hachijō is a pro-drop language, the "sufferer" can also be omitted:

ato=de kam-oosjaate ok-a(r)-o=jo dare=N=ka kam-are-tar-(o=w)a
afterward=LOC eat-INTEN leave-STAT-ATTR(NMLZ)=ACC who=DAT=INDET eat-PASS-STAT-ATTR=DECL
"Somebody ate (the food) that (I) had left out and had intended to eat later." (sufferer is "I")
後で食べようと置いておいたのを誰かに食べられた。

uno neQkome=ga=∅=o kono neQkome=N nom-are-tar-(o=w)a
that.ATTR cat=GEN=∅=ACC this.ATTR cat=DAT drink-PASS-STAT-ATTR=DECL
"This cat drank that cat's (drink)." (sufferer is "that cat")
あの猫のをこの猫に飲まれた。

haNzume jama=kaa keer-o toki=N ame=ni hur-are-te taĭheN =dar-ar-(o=w)a
just.now field=ABL return-ATTR time=DAT rain=DAT fall-PASS-PTCP awful =COP-STAT-ATTR=DECL
"Just now, when (I) was returning from the fields, (I) got rained on, and it was awful." (sufferer is "I")
さっき畑から帰るときに雨に降られて大変だったよ。

Another use of the passive extension is to express potentiality, that is, meanings such as an individual's ability, a general ability for anyone, a possible state, and past achievement:

dare=N =de=mo osei-rare-ro=wa
who=DAT =COP.PTCP=also teach-PASS-ATTR=DECL
"He can teach anyone." (specific ability)
誰にでも教えられるよ。

koko=no mizu=wa nom-are-ro=wa
here=GEN water=TOP drink-PASS-ATTR=DECL
"(People) can drink the water here." (general ability)
ここの水は飲める。

meNkjo=ga na-ke=Nte uNteN s-are-Nnak-(o=w)a
license=NOM not-ADJ.ATTR=because driving do-PASS.INF-NEG-ATTR=DECL
"Since you don't have a license, you are not able to drive." (possible state)
免許が無くて、運転できない。

joNbe=wa guQsuri ne-rare-tar-(o=w)a
last.night=TOP soundly sleep-PASS-STAT-ATTR=DECL
"I was able to sleep soundly last night." (past achievement)
夕べはぐっすり寝られた。

In a negative sentence, this potential meaning can also be used deontically to indicate a necessity:

kor(e=w)a na=o=mo cuke-zu=N kogo͡oN si-te=(w)a ok-are-Nna(k)-o=ga =tew-te
this.person=TOP name=ACC=even attach-NEG.INF=DAT this.way do-PTCP=TOP leave-PASS.INF-NEG-ATTR=but =QUOT.say-PTCP
"...saying, 'We cannot just leave this boy like this without a name,' ..."
「これは、名を付けずに、このようにしては置けないな」と言って

==== Potential -e- ====
The potential (可能, kanō; pot) extension is a specialized alternative to the passive extension that exists for Class 1 verbs and the irregular verb kurowa. It is made by adding the suffix -e- to the stems of Class 1 verbs, and kurowa becomes kore-. Like the passive, all potential forms are conjugated as Class 2b verbs.

Like the passive, the potential can also denote certain kinds of spontaneous actions (but not the passive):

are=N sir-e-te kotoba=ga koor-te ar-o=wa
me=DAT know-POT-PTCP word=NOM change-PTCP be-ATTR=DECL
"Our words are changing, I know it (to be true for myself, too)."
私に分かって、言葉が変わっている（自分でも変わったのが分かる）よ。

However, the potential extension's primary function is to indicate potentiality, much like one of the functions of the passive extension:

ware=N=mo zjouzu =n(i) sake=ga cug-e-ro=wa
me=DAT=also skillful =COP.INF alcohol=NOM pour-POT-ATTR=DECL
"I can pour sake well, too." (specific ability)
私には上手に酒が注げる。

koko=no mizu=wa nom-e-ro=wa
here=GEN water=TOP drink-POT-ATTR=DECL
"(People) can drink the water here." (general ability)
ここの水は飲める。

zikaN=ga ar-o=Nte nom-e-ro=wa
time=NOM be-ATTR=because drink-POT-ATTR=DECL
"Since I've got time, I can drink." (possible state)
時間があるから飲める。

kinei=wa teQcu=mo nom-e-Nnar-ar-(o=w)a
yesterday=TOP one.thing=even drink-POT.INF-NEG-STAT-ATTR=DECL
"I could not drink even one bit yesterday." (past achievement)
昨日は全然飲めなかった。

==== Causative -(s)ase- ====
The causative (使役, shieki; caus) extension is made by adding the suffix -ase- to the stems of Class 1 verbs, and -sase- to those of Class 2. For irregular verbs, sjowa becomes sase-, and kurowa becomes kosase-. In these forms, causatives are conjugated as Class 2b verbs. Especially in the Downhill Dialects, the ase found in this form can be reduced to ee by dropping of the s; in these forms, causatives are conjugated as Class 2c verbs.

This extension is used to form causative constructions, increasing a verb's valency by 1 to include a causer agent. The old subject becomes a new indirect object (in dative case), and the causer becomes the new subject (as a topic or in nominative case). This function can indicate direct causation (such as by a command) or indirect causation (such as by giving permission, or by allowing something to happen through inaction).

hoo=wa are=N huro=o wakas-a(s)e-tar-(o=w)a
mother=TOP me=DAT bath=ACC boil-CAUS-STAT-ATTR=DECL
"My mother made me heat up the bath."
母は私に風呂を沸かさせた。

kor(e-r)a=N katazuke-sase-ro=Nte omee-ra=o jasum-i-jar-e
this.person-PL=DAT tidy.up-CAUS-ATTR=because you(HON)-PL=ACC rest-INF-HON-IMP
"I'll get these people to take care of it, so rest easy."
この人たちにかたづけさせるから、あなたがたはお休みなされ。

kamabu =tew-te kogo͡oN juw-te miNna=N sjow-a(s)e-ta(r)-o =da(r)-o=zja
wage =QUOT.say-PTCP this.way bind-PTCP everyone=DAT carry-CAUS-STAT-ATTR(NMLZ) =COP-ATTR=DECL
"Calling it 'kamabu,' they tied up (the rice plants) like this and allowed everyone to carry them (back home)."
カマボ^{[sic]}と言って、こんなふうに（稲を）結って、（持って帰るように）みんなに背負わせたんだよね。

kodomo=ni=wa houkisi-ba=N kome=o cucum-te ni-te kam-ase-tar-ar-(u) =tew-o=zja
child=DAT=TOP leopard.plant-leaf=DAT rice=ACC wrap.up-PTCP boil-PTCP eat-CAUS-STAT-STAT-FIN =QUOT.say-ATTR=DECL
"I heard that they wrapped rice in leopard plant leaves, cooked it, and let the (important) child eat it."
（大切な）子供には、ツワブキの葉に米を包んで炊いて食べさせたそうじゃない。

uno-hito=ni jo-ke=o cukaw-ase-reba jo-kar-a(r)-o =ni macigaw-te heta =da(r)-o=o cukaw-ase-tar-(o=w)a
that.ATTR-person=DAT good-ADJ.ATTR(NMLZ)=ACC use-CAUS-PROV good-ADJ-STAT-ATTR(NMLZ) =COP.INF mistake-PTCP bad =COP-ATTR(NMLZ)=ACC use-CAUS-STAT-ATTR=DECL
"I should've had him use the good one, but I let him use the bad one by mistake."
あの人に良いのを使わせれば良かったのに、間違ってダメなのを使わせた。

In forms where ase is elided to ee and then inflected into its participle form, the -te that marks the participle can be dropped, much like Class 1.3A and 1.3A' verbs:

uku=N sak-ar-ci=o tor-azu=N cir-a(s)e-(te) simaw-ar-a(r)-o=zja
there=DAT bloom-STAT-RET(ATTR,NMLZ)=ACC take-NEG.INF=DAT scatter-CAUS-(PTCP) finish-STAT-STAT-ATTR=DECL
"You didn't pick what had bloomed there; you just let them scatter, right?"
あそこに咲いたのを採らずに散らせてしまったね。

== Syntax ==
Like Japanese, Hachijō is head-final, left-branching, topic-prominent, often omits nouns that can be understood from context, and has default subject–object–verb word order. Nouns exhibit neither grammatical gender nor number.

=== Quotations and reported speech ===
Quotations and reported speech, both direct and indirect, are fundamentally marked by the quotative particle -to, which follows the quoted speech.

The quotative particle is often followed by a verb of speaking or thinking, typically jowa "say" and omouwa "think," respectively. Due to vowel coalescence, -to often becomes -te when followed by jowa (underlying stem iw-). Similarly, the sequence -to omow- is usually trimmed to -to mow- by haplology.

In addition, certain forms of -te jowa often contract to make an irregular defective verb -teija (stem *-tew-, quot.say). This verb has the following forms:

- attributive + wa-declarative: teija (or teiwa in the Aogashima dialect) ← *te jo-wa
- attributive + "because": teite ← *te jo-Nte
- attributive + copular participle de: teide ← *te jo-de
- participle: teQte ← *tew-te ← te iQte

Any other forms are made periphrastically using the non-contracted to jowa ~ te jowa.

Except in exact quotations, verbs followed by the quotative particle generally use the final form (or a Japanese-style tense) in place of a wa-declarative form; the use of the final form in this construction is either fossilized from Old Japanese or influenced by mainland Japanese. Words followed by the quotative particle have a tendency to have their final syllable altered slightly:

- a Q can be inserted: nomu "drinks" + -teija → nomuQteija "it is said that he drinks"
- the vowel can be lengthened: wareenaka "won't laugh" + -te → wareenakaate "won't laugh" (direct quote)
- for Class 1.1C verbs (and verbal adjectives), -ru contracts to Q: *jokaru "is good" + -teite → jokaQteite "because they say it is good"

=== Kakari-musubi ===
Kakari-musubi (係り結び; "hanging-tying") is a grammatical phenomenon found in most Japonic languages where certain particles on nouns in a sentence influence the form that a sentence's verb takes. In Hachijō, it involves the change of a sentence-final verb from an expected declarative form (in -owa) to either the attributive or exclamatory form. Hachijō's kakari-musubi can be triggered by the use of the focus particles ka and koo, or by making a sentence into a question.

==== Interrogative kakari-musubi ====
This type of kakari-musubi surfaces in questions and in statements of wondering. Such a sentence will use the bare attributive form (連体形, rentaikei) for its main verb rather than a declarative form in -wa or -zja, for example. Effectively, this means that the declarative particle is dropped.

For examples and further information on forming questions, see the subsection on interrogative sentences.

==== Exclamatory kakari-musubi ====
This type of kakari-musubi is found in conjunction with the focus particle ka, which requires the main verb of the sentence to be in exclamatory form (已然形, izenkei). This construction is inherited from Old Japanese, possibly even Proto-Japonic.

a=ga=ka sake=o nom-ar-e
me=NOM=FOC alcohol=ACC drink-STAT-EXCL
"It was I who drank the alcohol."
私がコソ酒を飲んだよ。

uĭ=ga k-uro=Nte=ka koko=N ar-e
that.person=NOM come-ATTR=because=FOC here=DAT be-EXCL
"It is because that person will come that I am here."
あの人が来るからコソここにいるよ。

aNsei=ka iw-ar-e
why=FOC say-STAT-EXCL
"Why was it that I said (such a thing)?" (an expression of regret)
どうして（あんなことを）言ったんだろう。／なぜコソ言った。（後悔して）

jo-ku=ka ki-tar-e
good-ADJ.INF=FOC come-STAT-EXCL
"It's good that you have come."
ああ、来て良かったなあ。／良くコソ来た。

ar(e=w)a sake=o nom-i=ka si-tar-e
me=TOP alcohol=ACC drink-INF=FOC do-STAT-EXCL
"It was drinking that I did with the alcohol."
私は酒を飲みコソしたよ。

If the clause containing ka is used in a mermaid construction, then the following copula uses the exclamatory form instead:

omeidas-i-nagara=ka hanas-te ik-o =dar-e =ga
recall-INF-while=FOC talk-PTCP go-ATTR(NMLZ) =COP-EXCL =DM
"It is only as he remembers it that he will start talking about it."
思い出しながらコソ話していくんだよ。

==== Focalized exclamatory kakari-musubi ====
This type of kakari-musubi uses the focalizing suffix -naw- in its exclamatory form -nee, which always links to the particle -koo:

a=ga=koo sogo͡oN iw-ar-(u)-naw-e
me=NOM=FOC in.that.way say-STAT-FIN-FOCLZ-EXCL
"It was I who said so."
私がコソそう言ったんだ。

sugu=koo de-te k-uru-naw-e =goo
soon=FOC go.out-PTCP come-FIN-FOCLZ-EXCL =DM
"It will be soon that he'll start (talking), eh?"
すぐコソ（話が）出てくるんだよね。

Like ordinary exclamatory kakari-musubi, if the clause containing koo is used in a mermaid construction, then the following copula takes the focalizing exclamatory -nee:

hazime=wa heiki=de=koo si-tar-o =dar-(u)-naw-e =goo
beginning=TOP fine=LOC=FOC do-STAT-ATTR(NMLZ) =COP-FIN-FOCLZ-EXCL =DM
"At first, (not thinking it would be difficult,) I did it completely normally."
はじめは（こんなに大変だとは思わずに）平気でコソしたんだよ。

=== Interrogative sentences ===
For these types of sentences, it is not unheard of for the final vowel of the sentences to become lengthened if it is short i, u, or a.

==== Polar questions ====
For most polar questions, the particle ka (or its variant kaĭ) is used, and the main verb is usually required to be in attributive form (連体形, rentaikei) as a type of kakari-musubi:

kam-o=ka kam-i-Nna(k)-o=ka
eat-ATTR=Q eat-INF-NEG-ATTR=Q
"Will you eat, or won't you?"
食べるか？食べないか？

mada mei-ro=kaĭ
still burn-ATTR=Q
"Is it still burning?"
まだ燃えてるかい？

haru=o sj-o=kaĭ
sericulture=ATTR do-ATTR=Q
"Are you taking care of silkworms?" (a seasonal greeting)
蚕を飼ってるかい？

A specific kind of polar question can be marked instead by the sentence-final particle -kaN, a descendant of Old Japanese かも kamo_{2}. In the Mitsune dialect, these questions indicate that the speaker is recalling or trying to recall information as he or she is asking about it; in the Sueyoshi dialect, -kaN is the general marker for polar questions instead of -ka.

aroe=ga me=no mawari=i cuke-ru=to heta =dar-(o=w)a =te iw-a(r)-o=kaN
aloe=NOM eye=GEN around=ALL attach-JPRS=if bad =COP-ATTR=DECL =QUOT say-STAT-ATTR=Q
"Was it aloe that (he) said wasn't good to put around the eyes?"
アロエが目の回りに付けると良くないって言ったっけ？

kinei=wa omi=wa^{?} ame=ga hur-ar-(u)-naw-o=ga seNtaku-mono=wa kook-a(r)-o=kaN
yesterday=TOP you(POL)=TOP^{?} rain=NOM fall-STAT-FIN-CNJEC-ATTR=but laundering-thing=TOP dry-STAT-ATTR=Q
"I know it rained yesterday, but did your laundry dry?"
昨日はあなた、雨が降ったろうけど、洗濯物は乾いたかい？

==== Nonpolar questions ====
For most nonpolar questions, the main verb is used in attributive form (連体形, rentaikei) (instead of using a declarative particle like -wa) as a relic of kakari-musubi. Occasionally, a non-coalescing -ĭ can be heard attached to the end of the sentence:

ani=o nom-o
what=ACC drink-ATTR
"What will you drink?"
何を飲む？

ma=N jouke=kaĭ ani=o kam-o=ĭ
now=DAT dinner=Q what=ACC eat-ATTR=Q
"(Are you eating) dinner now? What are you eating?"
いま夕食かい？なに食べてるの？

asu=no toNmete=nja adaN nar-i-jar-o
tomorrow=GEN morning=DAT.TOP in.what.way become-INF-HON-ATTR
"What will (you) do (about it) tomorrow morning?"
明日の朝はどうします？

==== Infinitive questions ====
Certain questions are asked using the infinitive rather than the attributive. These questions ask for definitive answers about an action or event that began in the past, regardless of whether it has ended by the present time:

unu=mo kam-i
you=also eat-INF
"You ate, too?"
おまえも食ったの？

haa kusa=o tor-ar-(o=w)a / kusa=o tor-i
already grass=ACC take-STAT-ATTR=DECL / grass=ACC take-INF
"I already cut the grass." / "You cut the grass?"
もう草をとったよ。／草をとったの？

omee=mo dousi =ni ozjar-i
you(HON)=also together =COP.INF go(HON)-INF
"You also went with (them)?"
あなたも一緒にいらっしゃったの？

omee=gaa=Ncjee jobee=ni ik-izu dare=mo
you(HON)=portion=etc. night.crawling=DAT go-NEG.INF who=even
"Hasn't (anyone) ever snuck into your room or wherever at night? Anyone at all?"
あなたのとこへなんか夜這いに行かなかった？ 誰も？

ijoko=wa adaN nar-i
Iyoko=TOP in.what.way become-INF
"How has Iyoko been doing?"
イヨコはどうしてるの？

kinei=wa ani=o s-i
yesterday=TOP what=ACC do-INF
"What did you do yesterday?"
昨日は何をした？

==== Indirect questions ====
General expressions of guessing, contemplation, or wondering on the part of the speaker are usually expressed with the conjectural extension -naw- in its attributive form -nou. The element of the sentence that the speaker is wondering about is marked with the question marker ka.

doko=N=ka cjoucuk-ar-(u)-naw-o
where=DAT=Q abandon-STAT-FIN-CNJEC-ATTR
"Where could he have put it, I wonder?"
どこに置いたろう。

ur(e=w)a imo=o=ka kam-te ar-(u)-naw-o
that.person=TOP taro=ACC=Q eat-PTCP be-FIN-CNJEC-ATTR
"I wonder if it's a taro that that person is eating."
あの人はサトイモを食べているのかなあ。

doudake=ka ar-(u)-naw-o
what.extent=Q be-FIN-CNJEC-ATTR
"How much is there, I wonder?"
どのくらいあるかなあ。

The same form with -nou can also be used to express anger or exasperation:

dare=N=ka iw-u-naw-o kibigaarii
who=DAT=Q say-FIN-CNJEC-ATTR INTERJ
"Who do you think you're talking to?! Geez!"
誰に言ってるの！まったく！

==== Japanese-style questions ====
Japanese-style tenses can be used without ka for all kinds of questions, occasionally using a non-coalescing suffix -ĭ as well. These sentences can, but do not necessarily, imply a meaning of asking whether the listener shares the same volition or opinion as the speaker.

omee=wa asi=no jame-ru
you(HON)=TOP foot=NOM hurt-JPRS
"Does your foot hurt?" or "Do your feet hurt?"
あなたは足が痛む？

omee=wa kinoo ani=o s-i-jar-ta=ĭ
you(HON)=TOP yesterday what=ACC do-INF-HON-JPST=Q
"What did you do yesterday?"
あなたは昨日何をなさった？

Japanese-style tenses can also be combined with the postfixes -darou or -rou (both also borrowed from Japanese) to express a presumptive, confirming, or conjectural question:

nom-e-ru-darou
drink-POT-JPRS-PRSM
"You can drink, right?"
飲めるだろ？

dogo͡oN si-te aki-cjaN=wa kogo͡oN deeci-ku kak-u-darou
in.what.way do-PTCP Aki-DIM=TOP in.this.way clean-ADJ.INF write-JPRS-PRSM
"How can it be that Little Aki can write so neatly?"
どうやってアキちゃんはこんなに綺麗に書くのだろう？

ur(e=w)a haNzume koko=N oor-a(r)-edou ma=nja adaN nar-ta-rou
that.person=TOP just.now here=DAT be-STAT-CNCES now=DAT.TOP in.what.way become-JPST-PRSM
"That person was here just a moment ago, but what could he be doing now?" (lit. "what could have become of him now?")
あの人はさっきここにいたけど、今はどうしてるだろう？

doko=i hiQ-kakure-ta-rou
where=ALL INTS-hide-JPST-PRSM
"Where could he/it have gone?" (lit. "Where could he/it be hiding?")
どこへ行ったろう？

The Japanese-style present tense can be followed by ka to ask whether the listener shares the same volition or opinion as the speaker:

ani=o=ka nom-u=ka
what=ACC=INDET drink-JPRS=Q
"Shall we drink something?"
何か飲もう？

taihuu=ga k-uru=ka noo
typhoon=NOM come-JPRS=Q DM
"Will a typhoon come, (do you think)?"
台風が来るかねえ？

Finally, Japanese-style tenses (with or without the presumptive darou ~ -rou) can be used with ka and the discourse particle noo to express wondering (see also example 8 above):

haa tom-u=ka noo
already be.extinguished-JPRS=Q DM
"Has (the fire) already gone out, I wonder?"
もう（火が）消えるかなあ。

ame=ga hur-te ke-Nna-i-darou=ka noo
rain=NOM fall-PTCP give.INF-NEG-JPRS-PRSM=Q DM
"I wonder if it won't rain for us."
雨が降ってくれないだろうかねえ。

=== Mermaid constructions ===
Mermaid constructions, which are found across Japonic and in several other East Asian language families, are also found in Hachijō. All of them are formed from the attributive form (連体形, rentaikei) of a verb, followed by a grammaticalized noun or nominalizing morpheme, followed by a copula.

-(r)odara

This construction -(r)odara consists of a nominalized attributive verb followed by the copula dara, roughly translatable as "to be the case that ~." It is considered a mermaid construction because the nominalized attributive can also be analyzed as the normal attributive followed by an enclitic null noun.

This construction serves multiple uses in Hachijō, similar to its Japanese counterpart ～のだ no da; for example, it can mark a phrase as being explanatory (ex. 1), hortative (ex. 2), or something the speaker wishes to emphasize (ex. 3):

hukuro=no soko=ga na-ke =de
bag=GEN bottom=NOM not-ADJ.ATTR(NMLZ) =COP.PTCP
"Because the bag has no bottom..." or "It being the case that the bag has no bottom..."
袋の底が無いので

kei=wa omeiQkiri asub-o =dar-(o=w)a jou
today=TOP decisively play-ATTR(NMLZ) =COP-ATTR=DECL DM
"Today, let's play with all our heart, okay?"
今日は思いきり遊ぼうね。

are=wa wa=ga e=sjaN topi-te ik-a(r)-o =da(r)-o=zjaN
me=TOP me=GEN house=ORNT dash-PTCP go-STAT-ATTR(NMLZ) =COP-ATTR=DECL
"I (really) did dash off towards my house, eh?"
私が我が家へ駆けて行ったんだよね。

When the copula in this mermaid construction uses the infinitive form ni, the resulting sentence often has a contrastive meaning, akin to Japanese ～のに no ni:

hotour-i=mo s-i-Nna(k)-o =ni tarou-ni aor-are-te kaze=o hik-o toko =dar-ar-(o=w)a
be.hot-INF=even do-INF-NEG-ATTR(NMLZ) =COP.INF Tarō-DAT fan-PASS-PTCP cold=ACC catch-ATTR place =COP-STAT-ATTR=DECL
"Even though it wasn't hot at all, (I) was being fanned by Tarō, so (I) nearly caught a cold."
暑くもないのに、太郎に扇がれてカゼをひくところだった。

Unlike the Japanese ～のだ no da form, this construction can be freely used attributively (ex. 5), even in another mermaid construction (ex. 6):

koNdo oni=N nar-o =da(r)-o wake
next.time demon=DAT become-ATTR(NMLZ) =COP-ATTR circumstance
"the case in which (the person who loses) becomes 'it' in the next round"
（負けた人が）今度鬼になると言うわけ

kei=wa ura=N osei-ro =da(r)-o =dar-(o=w)a
today=TOP those.people=DAT teach-ATTR(NMLZ) =COP-ATTR(NMLZ) =COP-ATTR=DECL
"It is (now) the case that I will teach those people today."
今日はあの人たちに教えることになってるんだよ。

-(r)o tokodara

This construction uses toko "place." When the preceding clause does not use the stative, it indicates that the action is in progress, about to happen, or nearly happening:

ma=N huro=N heer-o toko =dar-(o=w)a
now=DAT bath=DAT enter-ATTR place =COP-ATTR=DECL
"I am about to get in the bath."
今風呂に入るところだ。

isi=ga maciQto=de buQ-ote-ro toko =dar-ar-(o=w)a
stone=NOM a.little.bit.more=LOC INTS-fall-ATTR place =COP-STAT-ATTR=DECL
"The stone was close to falling."
石がもう少しで落ちるところだった。

When it does use the stative, it indicates that the action has just happened:

dekake-ta(r)-o toko =dar-(o=w)a
depart-STAT-ATTR place =COP-ATTR=DECL
"He departed just now."
（今）出かけたところだ。

huro=i heer-a(r)-o toko =dar-ar-(o=w)a
bath=ALL enter-STAT-ATTR place =COP-STAT-ATTR=DECL
"I had just gotten in the bath."
風呂へ入ったところだった。

-(r)o moNdara

This construction uses moN, a reduced form of mono "thing."

When following a non-past expression, this construction is used to indicate what should be done in general cases, often as a kind of hortative expression:

sogo͡oN =da(r)-o toki=(w)a haQkiri iw-o moN =dar-(o=w)a
in.that.way =COP-ATTR time=TOP directly say-ATTR thing =COP-ATTR=DECL
"At such times, one should speak frankly."
そういう時ははっきり言うものだ。

When following a past expression, it instead indicates that the speaker is recalling or reminiscing about the information:

kaN=no uci=ni isogumi=o=wa jo-ku mog-te kam-a(r)-o moN =da(r)-o=ga noo
midwinter=GEN within=DAT silverberry=ACC=TOP good-ADJ.INF pick-PTCP eat-STAT-ATTR thing =COP-ATTR=but DM
"During midwinter, I often used to pick and eat silverberries, but (I don't anymore)."
寒のうちに、イソグミはよく捥いで食べたものだがね。

-(r)o hazudara

This construction uses the bound noun hazu, etymologically derived from the word for "nock," but functioning like a noun meaning "expectation." It indicates something that the speaker expects or expected to happen:

aNde sore=o nom-izu-isi nom-o hazu =dar-(o=w)a
why that=ACC drink-NEG.INF-DUB drink-ATTR expectation =COP-ATTR=DECL
"As if there's any reason why he wouldn't drink that. I think he will."
なんでそれを（あいつが）飲まないものか、飲むはずだ。

uĭ=mo k-uro hazu =da(r)-o =ni k-i-Nnak-(o=w)a
that.person=also come-ATTR expectation =COP-ATTR =COP.INF come-INF-NEG-ATTR=DECL
"That person is thought to be coming too, but he hasn't yet."
あの人も来るはずなのに来ない。

uĭ=mo utaw-o hazu =dar-a(r)-o=ga zikaN=ga na-kar-ar-(o=w)a
that.person=also sing-ATTR expectation =COP-STAT-ATTR=but time=NOM not-ADJ-STAT-ATTR=DECL
"That person was also expected to sing, but there wasn't enough time."
あの人も歌うはずだったが、時間が無かった。

-(r)o go͡oNdara

This construction uses go͡oN, a reduced form of gooni, which is perhaps a contraction from a form related to Early Middle Japanese ～が様に ga yaũ ni, akin to Modern Japanese ～のように no yō ni. It indicates resemblance or that an action seems to occur:

uno-hito=mo sogo͡oN omow-i-jar-o go͡oN =dar-(o=w)a
that.ATTR-person=also in.that.way think-INF-HON-ATTR seeming =COP-ATTR=DECL
"It seems that that person also thinks so."
あの人もそうお考えのようだ。

marude takoku=N ar-o go͡oN =dar-(o=w)a
almost.as.if another.country=DAT be-ATTR seeming =COP-ATTR=DECL
"It almost seems as if (he) is in another country."
まるでよその国にいるみたいだ。

In order to indicate a plan or objective, go͡oN (and its variants) can also be used by itself, which is a form of mermaid construction in its own right, as it technically contains the copular infinitive N ~ ni. This treats the whole subordinate clause as an adverbial phrase:

konasama=o koros-o go͡o=ni
silkworm=ACC kill-ATTR in.order.to=COP.INF
"in order to kill the silkworms"
蚕を殺すように

=== Honorific and humble speech ===
Like Japanese, Hachijō has a number of ways to grammatically express honorifics and humility. With regards to verbs, specific expressions can be used to express either honorific or humble meanings.

Honorific speech (尊敬語, sonkeigo) is used to exalt others when they are the subject of the sentence. Conversely, humble speech (謙譲語, kenjōgo) is used to lower oneself when the speaker (or a member of the speaker's in-group) is the subject of the sentence. For honorific speech, most verbs are inflected into their infinitive form, then attached to the auxiliary verb jarowa; e.g., jomowa "to read" → jomi-jarowa "to read (honorific)," roughly equivalent to Standard Japanese お読みになります o-yomi-ni-narimasu. To express humility, most verbs are inflected into their infinitive form, then attached to the auxiliary verb itasowa; e.g., jomowa "to read" → jomi-itasowa "to read (humble)," roughly equivalent to Standard Japanese お読みします o-yomi-shimasu or お読み致します o-yomi-itashimasu.

For verbal adjectives (ending in -kja), both honorific and humble speech are expressed by using the infinitive form -ku followed by the verb ozjarowa "to be"; the copula dara is similar, becoming de ozjarowa. Both -ku ozjarowa and de ozjarowa can be combined with jarowa and itasowa, as well.

Hachijō does not have a fully-developed polite (丁寧, teinei) level of speech, but there are a handful of polite verbs that are generally used instead of their basic counterparts in situations where the polite second-person pronoun omi would be used as the subject of a sentence. Outside of these exceptions, however, other verbs remain unchanged with omi. A handful of verbs have suppletive honorific and humble forms, as well. These irregularities are tabulated below:

Cognates	Hachijō			
Cognates	Basic	Polite	Honorific	Humble
行く (iku, to go)	ikowa	wasowa	ozjarowa (Note: It is common to expand these forms further, using jarowa for honorific speech and itasowa for humble speech.)	meerowa
来る (kuru, to come)	(de)kurowa	wasowa	ozjarowa	meerowa
いる (iru, to be, to exist)	arowa	wasowa	ozjarowa	(ari-itasowa)
飲む (nomu, to drink)	nomowa	meerowa	agarowa	tamourowa
食べる (taberu, to eat)	kamowa	meerowa	agarowa	tamourowa
寝る (neru, to sleep)	jasumowa	jadorowa	ojorowa	(jasumi-itasowa)
言う (iu, to say)	jowa	osunarowa	osjarowa	mousowa
見る (miru, to see)	mirowa	gouzirowa	(gouzi-jarowa)	(mi-itasowa)
くれる (kureru, to give [towards the speaker])	kerowa	tabowa	tamourowa (Note: Like Japanese 下さる (kudasaru), the Hachijō verb tamourowa is used in its imperative form tamoure to make humble requests, as in site tamoure "please do it (for me).")	— (Note: These spaces are empty due to a mismatch in meaning, as it is improper to honor oneself or to humble another.)
やる (yaru, to give [from the speaker])	(kerowa)	mooserowa	—	agerowa

There are also recorded instances where speakers have used honorific language when a humble meaning is meant, or vice versa, which can be seen as a trend toward a unified polite meaning of both honorific and humble language. A semantic shift has formerly occurred in Japanese as well, wherein the formerly humble Early Middle Japanese verbs 候ふ saurafu and 参らす mawirasu evolved into polite auxiliary verbs: Late Middle Japanese ～さうらう -sɔɔrɔɔ and Modern Japanese ～ます -masu.

== See also ==
- Japanese grammar
  - Japanese particles
  - Japanese verb conjugation
