= Nanosyntax =

Approach to linguistic syntax

Nanosyntax is an approach to syntax where the terminal nodes of syntactic parse trees may be reduced to units smaller than a morpheme. Each unit may stand as an irreducible element and not be required to form a further "subtree." Due to its reduction to the smallest terminal possible, the terminals are smaller than morphemes. Therefore, morphemes and words cannot be itemised as a single terminal, and instead are composed by several terminals. As a result, nanosyntax can serve as a solution to phenomena that are inadequately explained by other theories of syntax.

Some recent work in theoretical linguistics suggests that the "atoms" of syntax are much smaller than words or morphemes. It then follows that the responsibility of syntax is not limited to ordering "preconstructed" words. Instead, within the framework of nanosyntax, the words are derived entities built into syntax, rather than primitive elements supplied by a lexicon.

== History ==
=== Theoretical context ===
Nanosyntax arose within the context of other syntactic theories, primarily Cartography and Distributed Morphology. Cartographic syntax theories were highly influential for the thought behind nanosyntax, and the theories share many commonalities. Cartography seeks to provide a syntactic theory that fits within Universal Grammar by charting building blocks and structures of syntax present in all languages. Because Cartography is grounded in empirical evidence, smaller and more detailed syntactic units and structures were being developed to accommodate new linguistic data. Cartography also syntacticizes various domains of grammar, particularly semantics, to varying degrees in different frameworks. For example, elements of semantics which serve grammatical functions, such as features conveying number, tense, or case, are viewed as being a part of semantics. This trend towards including other grammatical domains within syntax is also reflected in nanosyntax. Other elements of cartography that are present in nanosyntax include a universal merge order syntactic categories and right branching trees/leftward movement exclusively. However, cartographic syntax conceptualizes the lexicon as a pre-syntactic repository, which contrasts with the Nanosyntactic view of the lexicon/syntax.

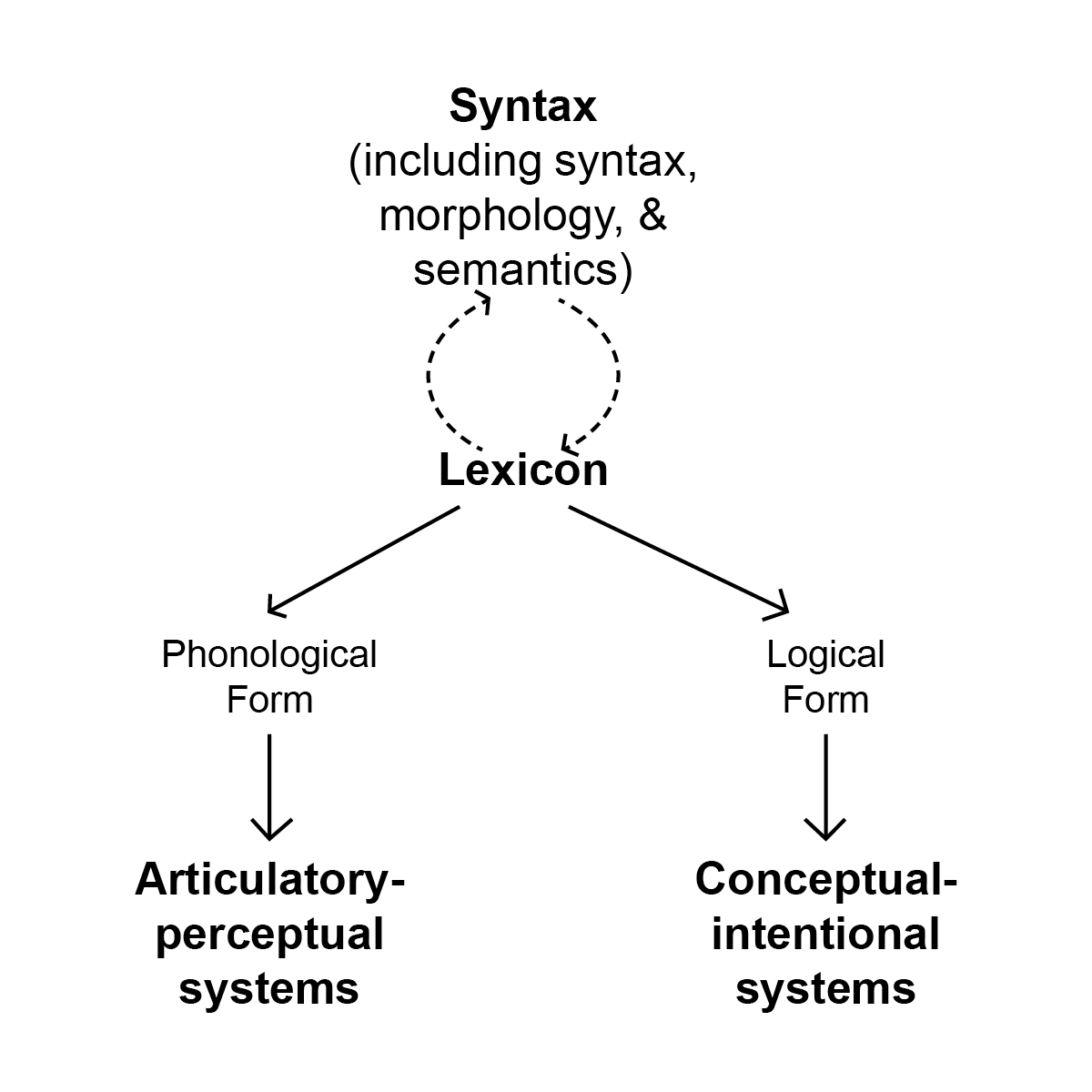
The architecture of grammar in Nanosyntactic theory.

Distributed Morphology provides an alternative to Lexicalist approaches to how the lexicon and syntax interact, that is, with words independently created in the lexicon and then organized using syntax. In Distributed Morphology, the lexicon does not function independently and is instead distributed across many linguistic processes. Both Distributed Morphology and nanosyntax are late insertion models, meaning that syntax is viewed as a pre-lexical/phonological process, with syntactic categories as abstract concepts. Additionally, both theories see syntax as responsible for both sentence- and word-level structure. Despite their many similarities, nanosyntax and Distributed Morphology still differ in a few key areas, particularly with regards to the architecture of how they theorize grammatical domains interacting. Distributed Morphology makes use of a presyntactic list of abstracted roots, functional morphemes, and vocabulary insertion which follows syntactic processes. In contrast, nanosyntax has syntax, morphology, and semantics working simultaneously as part of one domain which interacts throughout the syntactic process to apply lexical elements (the lexicon is a single domain in nanosyntax, while it is spread over multiple domains in Distributed Morphology). See the section Tools of nanosyntax below for more information.

Nanosyntactic theory is in direct conflict with theories that adopt views of the lexicon as an independent domain which generates lexical entries apart from any other grammatical domain. An example of such a theory is the Lexical Integrity Hypothesis, which states that syntax has no access to the internal structure of lexical items.

=== Reasoning ===
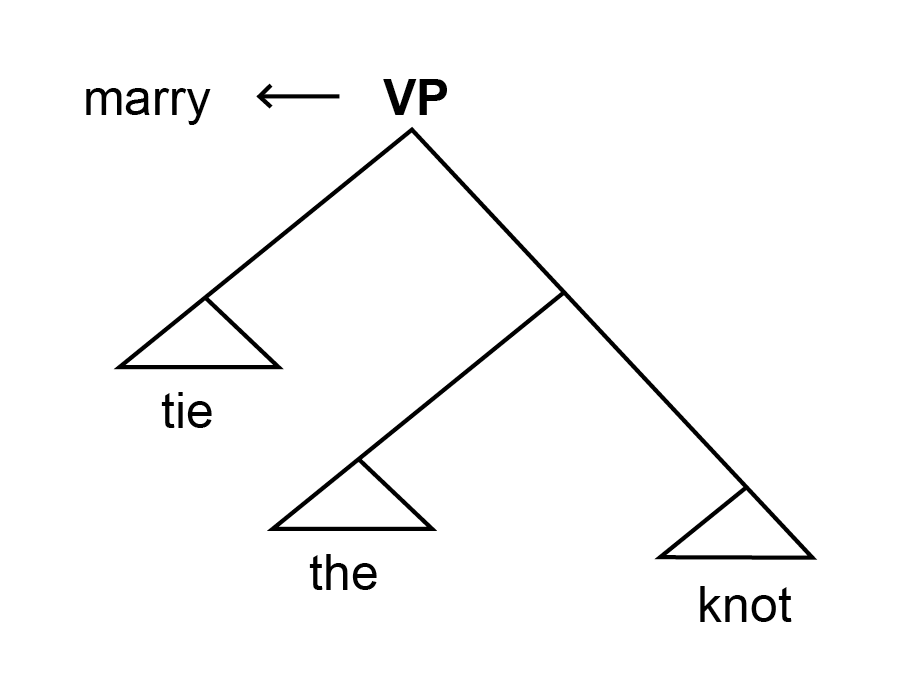
A subtree for the idiom "tie the knot," meaning "marry."

By adopting a theoretic architecture of grammar which does not separate syntactic, morphological, and semantic processes and by allowing terminals to represent sub-morphemic information, nanosyntax is equipped to address various failings and areas of uncertainty in previous theories. One example that supports these tools of nanosyntax is idioms, in which a single lexical item is represented using multiple words whose meaning cannot be determined cumulatively. Because terminals in nanosyntax represent sub-morphemic information, a single morpheme is able to span several terminals, thus creating a subtree. This accommodates the structure of idioms, which are best represented as a subtree representing one morpheme.

More evidence for the need for a Nanosyntactic analysis include analyzing irregular plural noun forms and irregular verb inflection (described in more detail in the Nanosyntactic Operations section) and analyzing morphemes which contain multiple grammatical functions (described in more detail in the Tools section).

== Nanosyntactic operations ==
Nanosyntax is a theory that seeks to fill in holes left by other theories when they seek to explain phenomena in language. The most notable phenomenon that nanosyntax tackles is that of irregular conjugation. For example, "goose" is irregular in that its plural form is not "gooses", but rather, "geese". This poses a problem to simple syntax, as without additional rules and allowances, "geese" should be found to be a suboptimal candidate for the plural of "goose" in comparison to "gooses".

=== Possible solutions ===
There are three manners by which syntacticians may attempt to resolve this. The first is a word-based treatment. In the above examples, “duck”, “ducks”, “goose”, and “geese” are all counted as separate heads under the category of nouns. Whether a word is singular or plural, is then marked in the lexical entry, and there does not exist a Number head with which affixes can be included to modify the root word. This theory requires significant work on the part of the speaker to retrieve the correct word. It is also considered lacking in the face of morphological concepts such as that displayed by the Wug test wherein children are able to correctly conjugate a previously unheard nonsense noun from its singular to its plural.

Distributed Morphology attempts to tackle the question through the process of fusion. Fusion is the process in which a noun head and its numeral head may fuse together under certain parameters to derive an irregular plural. In the above example, the plural of “duck” would simply select its plural allomorph “ducks”, and the plural of “goose” would select its plural allomorph “geese”, created through the fusion of “goose” and “-s”. In this way, distributed morphology is head-based. However, this theory still does not provide a reason as to why "geese" is preferable and a more optimal candidate for a plurality of geese over "gooses".

Nanosyntax goes about this dilemma by suggesting that rather than each word being a head, it is instead a phrase and can therefore be made into a subtree. Within the tree, heads can be assigned to override other heads in specific contexts. For example, if there is a head that says "-s" is added to a noun to turn it from a singular noun to a plural noun, but a head overrides it in the case of an irregularly conjugated plural noun such as "goose", it will select for the operation of the superseding head. Since it uses a formula and not rote memorisation of lexical items, it bypasses the challenges brought forth by a word-based treatment, and due to the arrangement of heads and their precedence, also provides a solution to the optimality concerns of Distributed Morphology.

Nanosyntax functions based on two principles: phrasal lexicalisation and the Elsewhere Principle.

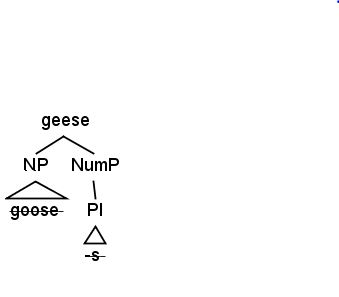
Phrasal Lexicalisation occurs here, where something can lexicalise another if it fits its specific parameters. In this example, “geese” can lexicalise “NP goose + NumP plural."

=== Phrasal lexicalisation ===
Phrasal lexicalisation is the concept that proposes that only lexical items can constitute terminal nodes. When this principle is applied, we can say that in regular plural nouns, there is no special lexicalisation (denoted in the below example using X) that needs to apply, and so standard pluralisation rules apply. The following is an example using "duck" where because there is no additional lexicalisation of the plural noun, an -s is added to pluralise the noun:

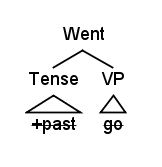
Irregular verbs can be parallel to Phonological Idioms (exemplified by "geese") and use Phrasal Lexicalisation as well.

X ↔ [_{PlP} [_{NP} DUCK] Pl duck ↔ [_{NP} DUCK](8) s ↔ Pl

This principle also allows for a word like "geese" to lexicalise [goose[Pl^{0}]. When an additional lexicalisation is present, instead of following the standard addition of -s to pluralise the noun, instead the lexicalisation rule takes over in the following manner:

geese ↔ [_{PlP} [_{NP} GOOSE] Pl .

=== Elsewhere Principle ===
The Elsewhere Principle seeks to provide a solution to the question of which lexicalisation applies to the noun in question. In simple terms, the lexicalisation that is more specific will always take precedence over a more general lexicalisation.

As illustrated, syntactic structure S seeks either lexicalisation from A ↔ [_{XP} X [_{YP} Y [_{ZP} Z ]]] or B ↔ [_{YP} Y [_{ZP} Z ]], B will win out over A because B lexicalises in a more specific situation whereas A lexicalises more generally. This solves the problem that Distributed Morphology faces when determining optimal pluralisation for irregular nouns.

=== Observable consequences ===
Caha proposed that there is a hierarchy in case as follows from broadest to narrowest: Dative, Genitive, Accusative, Nominative. Caha also suggested that each of these cases could be broken down into its most basic structures, each of which is a syntactic terminal, as follows:

Dative = [_{WP} W [_{XP} X [_{YP} Y [_{ZP} Z ]]]] Genitive = [_{XP} X [_{YP} Y [_{ZP} Z ]]] Accusative = [_{YP} Y [_{ZP} Z ]] Nominative = [_{ZP} Z ]

This is further outlined below, in the section Morphological Containment/Nesting.

As each is formed with sets within, it is possible for portions of the tense to be lexicalised by a separate noun. Therefore, there are several possibilities in syncretism patterns, namely AAAA, AAAB, AABB, ABBB, AABC, ABBC and ABCC. Some arrangements do not appear as possibilities because of the constraints laid on by the Elsewhere Principle. Notably, once there has been a switch to a separate lexicalisation, the lexicalisations from prior cannot return. In other words, there are no occurrences where once A turns to B or B to C, A or B reappears respectively. The Elsewhere Principle says that narrower lexicalisations win over broader lexicalisations, and once a narrower lexicalisation has been selected for, the broader lexicalisation will not reappear.

== Nanosyntax of specific categories ==
Nanosyntactic analyses have been developed for specific lexical categories, including nouns and prepositions.

=== Nouns ===
Nanosyntax has been found to be a useful analysis for explaining properties of nouns, more specifically patterns in their affixes. Across languages, syntacticians have used principles of nanosyntax such as Spellout (or Phrasal Lexicalisation) and the Elsewhere Principle (described above), and Cyclic Override (i.e. multiple spellout processes) to show that the structure of nouns are smaller than individual morphemes. These structures are underlying in our syntax, and it is the structure which dictates the morphemes as opposed to morphemes dictating structure. Descriptive analyses like those below, where morphemes are broken down into smaller units and given their own sub-morphemic structure, are possible using a nanosyntactic approach where morphemes are able to lexicalize multiple syntactic tree terminals.

==== English plural morpheme ====
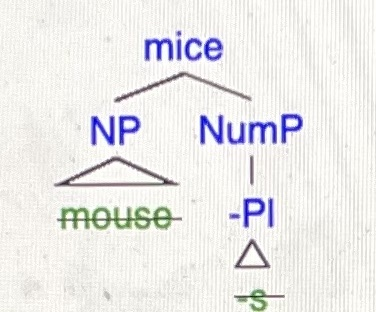
Syntax tree showing how spellout and the elsewhere principle allow irregular plurals in English

The structure of irregular plural nouns in English, and why they surface in the lexicon can be explained using a nanosyntactic approach. For example, the plural of mouse is not *mouses (* indicates ungrammaticality), it is mice. The structure of a plural noun can be broken down into the following morphemes: [Noun Plural] The lexical item mice is able to lexicalize both the noun and plural morphemes in one singular morpheme because it is both a larger and more specific structure than *mouse-s. This means that is more favourable because it spells out an entire syntactic sub-tree rather than an individual daughter node.

==== Nguni noun class prefixes ====
Research has been done on Nguni languages to develop a structure for the noun class prefixes. Each of the prefixes has a layered structure whereby different layers interact with other morphemes in the language. As a result, different syntactic parts of the morpheme will surface in different environments. The complete Class 2 prefix aba- surfaces in the noun aba-fundi ('the/some students'). However, in the vocative case, the initial vowel is not present: Molweni, (*a)ba-fundi ('Hi students'). The initial vowel is syntactically independent from the rest of the morpheme, able to appear in some environments and not others. Nanosyntax provides an explanation by positing that the initial vowel has a separate node from the rest of the morpheme in a subtree.

=== Prepositions ===
There lies some uncertainty in deriving prepositions in nanosyntax. Prepositions must precede the item with which they combine and not be moved due to Spellout (i.e., the need to replace a portion of the syntactic tree with a lexical item). Three proposed approaches that aim to justify this are spanning, head movement, and the existence of an additional workspace for complex heads.

Spanning refers to the operation in which the categorical features of a lexical item can associate it with various heads (i.e., a head and its related heads, determined by mutually selected maximal projections). The approach restricts that all associated heads must be contiguous, but the item need not form a constituent. Under this approach, prepositions may be antecedently lexicalized even if they do not hold constituent status.

Head movement has been suggested to be responsible for the order of morphemes within a word. The Nanosyntactic approach results in an ordering of affixes that poses a problem for head movement, which has caused some debate. This motivates the argument posited by some researchers that phrasal movements are responsible for specific orderings of morphemes, meaning that head movement is dispensable and only need be understood as a special case of phrasal movement called “roll-up.” Nonetheless, other researchers abide by movement restrictions as they only apply movement for constituents containing a head. Such attempts to keep movement operations simple make it possible for those following a Nanosyntactic approach to use the same operations as conventional minimalist syntax (in which terminal nodes are lexical items).

The suggestion of an additional workspace for complex heads conceptualizes that the prefixal element is created in a separate space. Thereafter, it combines antecedently with the remaining structure in the primary workspace, allowing the assembled item to maintain its internal ordering of features.

== Tools ==
Nanosyntax uses a handful of tools in order to map out fine-grained elements of the language being analyzed. Beyond Spellout Principles, there are three main tools for this system based on the writings of Baunaz, Haegeman, De Clercq, and Lander in Exploring Nanosyntax.

=== Semantics ===
The universal structure of compositionality is used in order for mapping within sentences semantically. This deals with mapping which feature words are composed of which structures a given word is semantically "constructed on". Semantic considerations impact the parameters of structural seize of a sentence, based on semantic categories of things such as verbs. This is an important guiding feature on what elements of syntax need to be aligned with semantic markers.

=== Syncretism ===
Syncretism has played a central role in the development of nanosyntax. This system combines two distinct morphosyntactic structures on the surface of a sentence: such as two grammar functions that are contained within a single lexical form. An example of this could be something like the French "à" which can be used to indicate a location or a goal; this is therefore a Location-Goal syncretism. This observation of a syncretism comes from work investigating patterns of the readings of words such as goal "to", route "via", and location "at" cross-linguistically performed by linguistics as suggested by Svenonius.

Case syncretism have been determined to only be possible with adjacent cases, based on the ABA theorem. This therefore can be used to target adjacent elements in the ordering of cases, such as nominative and accusative cases in languages such as English. Through using syncretism in nanosyntax, a universal order of cases can be identified, through determining which cases sit beside one another. This finding allows linguists to understand which features are present, as well as their order.

=== Morphological containment ===
$\mathsf{ \underbrace{\qquad K_6 \qquad > \underbrace{\qquad K_5 \qquad > \underbrace{\qquad K_4 \qquad > \underbrace{\qquad K_3 \qquad > \underbrace{\qquad K_2 \qquad > \underbrace{\qquad K_1 \qquad} _{NOM}} _{ACC}} _{GEN}} _{DAT}} _{INS}} _{COM}}$
The nesting of cases assumed in nanosyntax.

Morphological containment relates to the hierarchy of linear order in syntactic structures. Syncretism may reveal linear order, but is unable to determine in which direction the linear order occurs. This is where morphological containment is required. It is used in this context to posit the hierarchy of cases. Syncretism can determine the linear order of cases is COM > INS > DAT > GEN > ACC > NOM or NOM > ACC > GEN > DAT > INS > COM, but morphological containment decides whether it is nominative or comitative initial. These case features can be understood as sets of each other, where features build on top of one another, with the first feature being a singleton, but the next feature is the first and second nested within itself- and so on. These sets can be referred to as the above-mentioned features. Alternatively, to simplify the nesting of the features, one can label them as K_{1/etc} as proposed by Pavel Caha. Arguments for nominative case being the simplest and first case can be linked to its simplicity in structure and features. Examples are found in natural language which suggest an order beginning with NOM and ending with COM, such as in West Tocharian, where the ACC plural ending -m is found nested in the GEN/DAT ending -mts. This is a surface representation of the ordering of case through use of nesting in nanosyntax.

== See also ==
- Syntax
- Morphology
- Distributed morphology
- Universal grammar
- Lexical semantics
- Syncretism
- Semantics
