= Gregory Stump =

American linguist (born 1954)

- Born: 1954 (age 71–72)

Academic background
- Education: Ohio State University (PhD), University of Kansas (BA)

Academic work
- Discipline: linguistics
- Sub-discipline: morphology, linguistic typology
- Institutions: University of Kentucky

Gregory T. Stump (born 1954) is an American linguist and Emeritus Professor of Linguistics at the University of Kentucky. He is a Fellow of the Linguistic Society of America and is known for his works on linguistic morphology. Stump was one of the founding Editors (with Laurie Bauer and Heinz Giegerich) of the linguistic morphology journal, Word Structure.

== Books ==
- Morphotactics: A Rule-Combining Approach. Cambridge University Press 2023
- Inflectional Paradigms: Content and Form at the Syntax-Morphology Interface. Cambridge University Press 2016
- Morphological Typology: From Word to Paradigm. with Raphael A. Finkel. Cambridge University Press 2013
- Inflectional Morphology: A Theory of Paradigm Structure. Cambridge University Press 2001
- The Semantic Variability of Absolute Constructions, Dordrecht: Reidel 1985
