= Righthand head rule =

In generative morphology, the righthand head rule is a rule of grammar that specifies that the rightmost morpheme in a morphological structure is almost always the head in certain languages. What this means is that it is the righthand element that provides the primary syntactic and/or semantic information. The projection of syntactic information from the righthand element onto the output word is known as feature percolation. The righthand head rule is considered a broadly general and universal principle of morphology. In certain other languages it is proposed that rather than a righthand head rule, a lefthand head rule applies, where the lefthand element provides this information.

== The righthand head rule in derivational morphology ==
In derivational morphology (i.e. the creation of new words), the head is that morpheme that provides the part of speech (PoS) information. According to the righthand head rule, this is of course the righthand element.

For instance, the word 'person' is a noun, but if the suffix '-al' were added then 'personal' is derived. 'Personal' is an adjective, and the righthand head rule holds that the PoS information is provided by the suffix '-al', which is the righthand element.

The adverb 'personally' is derived from 'personal' by adding the suffix '-ly'. The PoS-information is provided by this suffix which is added to the right of 'personal'.

The same applies to the noun 'personality', which is also derived from 'personal', this time by adding the nominal suffix '-ity' to the right of the input word. Again the PoS-information is projected from the righthand element.

The three above examples may be formalized thus (N=noun, ADJ=adjective, ADV=adverb):

- person_{N} + -al_{ADJ} = personal_{ADJ}
- personal_{ADJ} + -ly_{ADV} = personally_{ADV}
- personal_{ADJ} + -ity_{N} = personality_{N}

They are all instances of the righthand head rule, which may be formalized as:

- A_{x} + B_{y} = C_{y}

== The righthand head rule in inflectional morphology ==
The righthand head rule may also be applied to inflectional morphology (i.e. the addition of semantic information without changing the word class). In relation to inflectional morphology, the righthand head rule holds that the rightmost element of a word provides the most essential additional semantic information.

For example, the past tense form of 'play' is created by adding the past tense suffix '-(e)d' to the right. This suffix provides the past tense feature which is also the main additional semantic content of the output word 'played'.

Likewise, the plural form of 'dog' is created by the addition of the plural nominal suffix '-s' to the right of the input. Thus 'dogs' inherits its plurality feature from the suffix.

The same thing goes for the comparative form of the adjective 'ugly'. 'Uglier' is created by the addition of the comparative suffix '-er' to the right, thus receiving its comparative feature from the suffix.

Formalizing the examples shows that the underlying principle of inflection is basically the same as the righthand head rule (INF=infinitive, P=past tense, SG=singular, POS=positive, COM=comparative):

- play_{INF} + -(e)d_{P} = played_{P}
- dog_{SG} + -s_{PL} = dogs_{PL}
- ugly_{POS} + -er_{COM} = uglier_{COM}

== The righthand head rule in compounds ==
Another area of morphology where the righthand head rule seems applicable is that of compounding (i.e. the creation of a word by combining two or more other words), in which it holds that the righthand word provides both the essential semantic information and the word class.

For instance, the noun 'runway' combines a verb and a noun. Since it refers to a kind of way rather than a kind of running, and since it is a noun and not a verb, the head is 'way', which appears on the right.

The noun 'wheelchair' combines two nouns. The primary element is the righthand one - namely, 'chair' - since the word refers to a kind of chair rather than a kind of wheel.

Again formalizations show that the underlying principle must be the righthand head rule:

- run_{V} + way_{N} = runway_{N (kind of way [i.e. path])}
- wheel_{N} + chair_{N} = wheelchair_{N (kind of chair)}

== Criticisms of the righthand head rule ==
The righthand head rule is taken to be a universal principle of morphology, but has been subject to much severe criticism. The main point of criticism is that it is empirically insufficient because it ignores numerous cases where the head does not appear in the righthand position (PREP=preposition, NEG=negation):

- un-_{V} + horse_{N} = unhorse_{V}
- en-_{V} + able_{ADJ} = enable_{V}
- passer_{N} + by_{PREP} = passer-by_{N}
- dis-_{V NEG} + charge_{V} = discharge_{V NEG}
- un_{ADJ NEG} + happy_{ADJ} = unhappy_{ADJ NEG}

Another main point of criticism is that the righthand head rule is too Eurocentric, or even Anglocentric, taking into consideration only morphological processes typical of European languages (mainly English) and ignoring processes from languages all over the world. Certainly in certain languages a lefthand head rule applies rather than a righthand head rule.

Many linguists reject the righthand head rule as being too idealizing and empirically inadequate.
