= Morphology =

Morphology, from the Greek and meaning "study of shape", may refer to:

== Disciplines ==
- Morphology (archaeology), study of the shapes or forms of artifacts
- Morphology (astronomy), study of the shape of astronomical objects such as nebulae, galaxies, or other extended objects
- Morphology (biology), the study of the form or shape of an organism or part thereof
- Morphology (folkloristics), the structure of narratives such as folk tales
- Morphology (linguistics), the study of the structure and content of word forms
- Mathematical morphology, a theoretical model based on lattice theory, used for digital image processing
- River morphology, the field of science dealing with changes of river platform
- Urban morphology, study of the form, structure, formation and transformation of human settlements
- Geomorphology, the study of landforms
- Morphology (architecture and engineering), research which is based on theories of two-dimensional and three-dimensional symmetries, and then uses these geometries for planning buildings and structures
- In chemistry and materials science, the study of allotropes, isomers, or material polymorphs

== Other ==
- Journal of Morphology, peer-reviewed scientific journal of anatomy and morphology
- Morphology (journal), peer-reviewed academic journal in linguistic morphology
- Morphology, 1994 album by Finnish band Neuroactive

== See also ==
- Morphological analysis (disambiguation)
