= Nominalization =

Grammatical formation of nouns from other types of words

In linguistics, nominalization or nominalisation, also known as substantivation or nouning, is the use of a word that is not a noun (e.g., a verb, an adjective or an adverb) as a noun, or as the head of a noun phrase. This change in functional category can occur through morphological transformation, but it does not always. Nominalization can refer, for instance, to the process of producing a noun from another part of speech by adding a derivational affix (e.g., the noun "legalization" from the verb "legalize"), but it can also refer to the complex noun that is formed as a result.

Some languages simply allow verbs to be used as nouns without inflectional difference (conversion or zero derivation), while others require some form of morphological transformation. English has cases of both.

Nominalization is a natural part of language, but some instances are more noticeable than others. Writing advice sometimes focuses on avoiding overuse of nominalization. Texts that contain a high level of nominalized words can be dense, but these nominalized forms can also be useful for fitting a larger volume of information into smaller sentences. Often, using an active verb (rather than a nominalized verb) is the most direct option.

== In various languages ==
=== English nominalization ===
Two types of nominalization occur in English. The first requires the addition of a derivational suffix to a word to create a noun. In other cases, English uses the same word as a noun without any additional morphology. This second process is referred to as zero-derivation.

==== Derivational morphology and nominalization ====
Derivational morphology is a process by which a grammatical expression is turned into a noun phrase. For example, in the sentence "Combine the two chemicals," combine acts as a verb. This can be turned into a noun via the addition of the suffix -ation, as in "The experiment involved the combination of the two chemicals." There are many suffixes that can be used to create nouns. Huddleston (2002) provides a thorough list that is split into two main sections: person/instrument nominalizations and action/state/process nominalizations. An especially common case of verbs being used as nouns is the addition of the suffix -ing, known in English as a gerund.

Nominalization by way of derivational morphology
Nominalization type	Derived nominals	Formation	Sentence examples
Nominalized adjective	applicability	applicable (Adj) + -ibility	The applicability of the law in this case is debatable.
	intensity	intense (Adj) + -ity	The intensity of her gaze frightened the dog.
	happiness	happy (Adj) + -ness	Her happiness was a result of having her loving friends.
Nominalized verb	reaction	react (V) + -ion	The children's reactions to receiving candy were priceless.
	refusal	refuse (V) + -al	The board's refusal to consider the motion ended the meeting.
	adjustment	adjust (V) + -ment	Starting University is a big adjustment.
Gerundive nominalization	writing	write (V) + -ing	Writing is a difficult skill to learn in a new language.
	running	run (V) + -ing	Running is a cardio-heavy exercise.
	cutting	cut (V) + -ing	Cutting the grass is fun.

==== Zero-derivation nominalization ====
Some verbs and adjectives in English can be used directly as nouns without the addition of a derivational suffix, depending on the syntax of a sentence. Zero-derivation nominalization is also called conversion.

Zero-derivation nominalization examples
Token	Lexical category	Usage
change	verb	I will change.
change	noun	I need a change.
murder	verb	He will murder the man.
murder	noun	The murder of the man was tragic.

==== Stress- and pronunciation-dependent nominalization ====
In addition to true zero-derivation, English also has a number of words which, depending on changes in pronunciation (typically syllable stress), can change functional category to either act as a noun or a verb. One such type, which is rather pervasive, is the change in stress placement from the final syllable of the word to the first syllable (see Initial-stress-derived noun).

Initial-stress derived noun
Example: increase	Lexical category	Usage
(increase, /ˈɪnkriːs/)	noun	Profits have shown a large increase.
(increase, /ɪnˈkriːs/)	verb	Profits will continue to increase.

An additional case is seen with the verb use, which has a different pronunciation when used as a noun. The nominal case of use has a word final voiceless alveolar fricative /s/, while the verbal case of use has a word final voiced alveolar fricative, /z/. Which of two sounds is pronounced is a signal, in addition to the syntactic structure and semantics, as to the lexical category of the word use in the context of the sentence.

Pronunciation derived noun
Example: use	Lexical category	Usage
(use, (use, N, /ˈjuːs/)	noun	The use of forks is dangerous.
(use, (use, V, /ˈjuːz/)	verb	Use your fork!

In some circumstances, adjectives can also have nominal use, as in the poor to mean poor people in general. See nominalized adjective.

=== Other Indo-European languages ===
Many Indo-European languages have separate inflectional morphology for nouns, verbs, and adjectives, but often this is no impediment to nominalization, as the root or stem of the adjective is readily stripped of its adjectival inflections and bedecked with nominal inflections—sometimes even with dedicated nominalizing suffixes. For example, Latin has a number of nominalization suffixes, and some of these suffixes have been borrowed into English, either directly or through Romance languages. Other examples can be seen in German—such as the subtle inflectional differences between deutsch (adj) and Deutsch (noun) across genders, numbers, and cases—although which lexical category came first may be moot. Spanish and Portuguese, whose o/os/a/as inflections commonly mark both adjectives and nouns, shows a very permeable boundary as many roots straddle the lexical categories of adjective and noun (with little or no inflectional difference).

=== Chinese ===
In all varieties of Chinese, particles are used to nominalize verbs and adjectives. In Mandarin, the most common is 的 de, which is attached to both verbs and adjectives. For example, 吃 chī (to eat) becomes 吃的 chīde (that which is eaten). Cantonese uses 嘅 ge in the same capacity, while Minnan uses ê.

Two other particles, found throughout the Chinese varieties, are used to explicitly indicate the nominalized noun as being either the agent or patient of the verb being nominalized. 所 (suǒ in Mandarin) is attached before the verb to indicate patient, e.g. 吃 (to eat) becomes 所吃 (that which is eaten), and 者 (zhě in Mandarin) is attached after the verb to indicate agent, e.g. 吃 (to eat) becomes 吃者 (he who eats). Both particles date from Classical Chinese and retain limited productivity in modern Chinese varieties.

There are also many words with zero-derivation. For instance, 教育 jiàoyù is both a verb (to educate) and a noun (education). Other cases include 变化 biànhuà (v. to change; n. change), 保护 bǎohù (v. to protect; n. protection), 恐惧 kǒngjù (v. to fear; n. fear; adj. fearful), etc.

=== Vietnamese ===
In Vietnamese, nominalization is often implicit with zero derivation, but in formal contexts or where there is a potential for ambiguity, a word can be nominalized by prepending a classifier. Cái, tính (indicating quality) and Sự are the most general classifiers used to nominalize verbs and adjectives, respectively. Other nominalizing classifiers include đồ (indicating object like đồ dùng, đồ chơi, đồ nghề, đồ hiệu, sometimes used a pejorative word like đồ xấu xa, đồ ăn hại), điều, con (indicating an animal, like con gà, con chó, con kiến and can be used a pronoun), nét (indicating the portrait of something or someone, like nét đẹp, nét chữ, nét vẽ, nét ngài nở nang (The tale of Kieu)), vẻ (indicating the form or appearance of something, vẻ đẹp, vẻ bề ngoài, vẻ sang trọng) việc (indicating job, task, affair, like việc làm, việc học, việc đi lại).

=== Tibeto-Burman ===
Nominalization is a pervasive process across Tibeto-Burman languages. In Bodic languages nominalization serves a variety of functions, including the formation of complement clauses and relative clauses.

=== Japanese ===
Japanese grammar makes frequent use of nominalization (instead of relative pronouns) via several particles such as の no, もの mono and こと koto. In Old Japanese, nouns were created by replacing the final vowel, such as mura (村, "village") created from muru (群る, "gather"), though this type of noun formation is obsolete.

==== Dual nature of syntactic nominalization ====
Syntactic nominals share some properties with lexically-derived nominals, they must be formed in the syntactic components, consisting of verbal projections. The duality of nominalization in Japanese grammar brings up the issue of whether or not VP (vP) should be postulated for the projection of arguments inside the nominal.

==== Nominal and verbal properties in Japanese ====
Causative, passive, and honorific verb marking inside kata-nominals provide evidence that a vP structure should be postulated.

-kata (-方) 'way' suffixed to the "renyookei" (adverbial) form of a verb:

The syntactic nominals that are shared with ordinary lexical nominals

John-no hon-no yomi-kata
John-GEN book-GEN read-way
'the way of John's reading a book'

Mary-no butai-de-no odori-kata
Mary-GEN stage-on-GEN dance-way
'the way of Mary's dancing on the stage'

Nominalized versions

John-ga hon-o yon-da.
John-NOM book-ACC read-PAST
'John read a book.'

Mary-ga butai-de odot-ta.
Mary-NOM stage-on dance-PAST
'Mary danced on the stage.'

The arguments of syntactic nominals, just like those of lexical nominals, cannot be marked with a nominative, accusative or dative case. Following are not attested forms in Japanese.

*John-ga hon-o yomi-kata
John-NOM book-ACC read-way
'the way in which John reads the book'

*John-ga ronbun-o kaki-naosi
John-NOM paper-ACC write-fixing
'John's rewriting of the paper'

The arguments of these nominals, although both subjects and objects are marked only with genitive cases.

As proven above, syntactic and lexical nominals share some structural similarities. Further analysis reveals that syntactic and constituent (linguistics) at the sentential level are similar as well. This proposes that syntactic nominals are produced at the syntactic level and it can be applied to any clause type. Lexical nominals are created by the lexicon which limits the clauses in which they can be applied.

=== Hawaiian ===
In Hawaiian, the particle ʻana is used to nominalize. For example, "hele ʻana" is Hawaiian for "coming." Hence, "his coming" is "kona hele ʻana."

=== Zero-derivation in other languages ===
A few languages allow finite clauses to be nominalized without morphological transformation. For instance in Eastern Shina (Gultari) the finite clause [mo buje-m] 'I will go' can appear as the nominalized object of the postposition [-jo] 'from' with no modification in form:

[mo buje-m]-jo muçhore ŗo buje-i
I go-1sg-from before he go-3sg
"He will go before I go."

== Syntactic analyses ==
=== Introduction to syntactic analyses ===
The syntactic analysis of nominalization continues to play an important role in modern theory, which dates back to Noam Chomsky's hallmark paper "Remarks on Nominalization". Such remarks promoted the restrictive view of the syntax, as well as the need to separate syntactically-predictable constructions such as gerunds from less predictable formations and specifically-derived nominals.

In the current literature, researchers seem to take one of two stances when proposing a syntactic analysis of nominalization. The first is a lexicalist argument structure approach in which researchers propose that syntactic argument structure (AS) is transferred to the nominal (noun word) from an embedded verb. The second is a structural approach in which researchers analyze the dominance structures of nodes to account for nominalization. An example of a structural analysis is that there must be a VP node within a nominal that accounts for the syntactic argument structure. Both models attempt to explain the ambiguous cases of nominal readings, such as that of “examination,” which can be read both eventively and non-eventively.

=== Emergence of X'-scheme – Chomsky (1965) ===
One of Chomsky's primary concerns at the time was to generate an explanation and understanding for linguistic theory, or "explanatory adequacy." Further insight emerged from the development of the Universal Grammar Theory. The goal of Universal Grammar (UG) is to specify possible languages and provide an evaluation procedure that selects the correct language given primary linguistic data. The further usage of X' theory introduced a new approach in analyzing fixed principles that regulate the range of possible languages and a finite set of rules arranged to acquire a language.

=== Chomsky and nominalization ===
Chomsky's article "Remarks of Nominalization" has been considered a central point of reference in the analysis of nominalization and has been cited in numerous theories of nominalization. In that article, he proposes the Lexicalist hypothesis and explains that most analyses of nominalization across languages assign at least one role to the lexicon in their derivation.

==== Derived and gerundive nominals ====
In his 1970 paper "Remarks on Nominalization," Chomsky introduces two types of nominals that are extremely important for nominalization in English: derived nominals and gerundive nominals. Chomsky describes gerundive nominals as being formed from propositions of subject-predicate form, such as with the suffix “-ing” in English. Gerundive nominals also do not have the internal structure of a noun phrase and so cannot be replaced by another noun. Adjectives cannot be inserted into the gerundive nominal. Chomsky argues that derived nominals in English are too irregular and unpredictable to be accounted for by syntactic rules. He claims that it is impossible to predict whether a derived nominal exists and what affix it takes. In contrast, gerundive nominals are regular and predictable enough to posit a syntactic analysis, as all gerundives are verbs with the affix -ing.

Gerundive nominal exemplars
Gerundive nominal	Example
being	Anna's being eager to please
refusing	Anna's politely refusing the food
criticizing	Anna's criticizing the paper

Chomsky explains that derived nominals have the internal structure of a noun phrase and can be quite varied and distinctive. For example, in English they can be formed with many different affixes such as -ation, -ment, -al, and -ure. Chomsky also notes that there are many restrictions on the formation of derived nominals.

Derived nominal exemplars
Derived nominal	Example
eagerness	Anna's eagerness to please
refusal	Anna's refusal of the food
criticism	Anna's criticism of the paper

=== Argument structure analysis – Grimshaw (1994) ===
==== Internal and external arguments ====
Predicates, or verb phrases, take arguments (see argument (linguistics)). Broadly, arguments can be divided into two types: internal or external. Internal arguments are those that are contained within the maximal projection of the verb phrase, and there can be more than one of them. External arguments are those that are not contained within the maximal projection of the verb phrase and are typically the "subject" of the sentence.

Internal and external arguments examples
Sentence	Internal argument(s)	External argument
Karen [VP went to the store]	[DP the store]	[DP Karen]
Karen [VP drove herself to the store]	[DP herself], [DP the store]	[DP Karen]

==== Argument structure theory ====
Grimshaw's 1994 analysis of nominalization is based in argument structure theory, which analyzes the argument structures of predicates. She proposes that argument structures have inherent, internal organizations and so there are degrees of prominence of arguments, which distinguish this organization structure. The degrees of prominence are proposed to be determined by the characteristics of the predicates. For the purpose of her analysis, the argument prominence is given as Agent, Experiencer, Goal/Location, and Theme.

This internal structure is posited as a result of extension of the intrinsic semantic properties of the lexical items, and in actuality that theta roles, the aforementioned argument types (agent, experiencer, goal/location, and theme), should be eliminated from any discussion of argument structure because they have no effect on the grammatical representation. Rather, the prominence relationships of those arguments is sufficient for analyzing verbal external arguments. Evidence can be seen with both Japanese and English examples.

Japanese syntactic structures illustrate that there are requirements for the locality of these argument types and so their positions are not interchangeable, and a hierarchy seems to be established. In English, verbal compounds create theta-marking domains such that for ditransitive verbs, which take two internal arguments, and one external argument, and so for grammatical representation to surfacesl, the internal arguments must be split, with the more prominent argument being inside the compound and the less prominent internal argument being outside the compound.

Grimshaw also proposes an aspectual theory of external arguments, which she extends to complex event nominals by proposing they have an internal aspect and inherit the verb base argument structure.

==== Nominalization-argument structure analysis ====
Grimshaw analyzes nominalization with a lexical argument structure approach. The relationship between nouns and verbs is described differently from prior research in the sense that it is proposed that some nominals take obligatory arguments but others do not, depending on the event-structure. The biggest issue in proposing an account of argument structure for nominals comes from their ambiguous nature, unlike verbs. Nouns that can take arguments, unlike verbs, also sometimes take arguments that can be construed as optional in some cases and not optional in others. Grimshaw proposes for that ambiguity to be ignored such that there are nouns that can take arguments, and there are nouns that cannot. That is because there are nouns that behave like verbs and require arguments, and there are nouns in arguments seem to be optional or do not take arguments at all.

==== Types of events ====
Three types of events are described which are denoted by nouns: complex events, simple events, and results. Complex events are denoted by nouns that have an argument structure and so can take arguments. Simple events and result nominals are proposed as being without argument structure, and so they cannot take arguments.

In English, nominals formed by -ation are ambiguous, and the reading can either be eventive (Argument Structure) or non-eventive. Nominals formed by the addition of -er are also ambiguous, but the ambiguity is between an agentive reading (Argument structure) and an instrumental reading.

Grimshaw's proposal of argument structure nominals can be found outlined in Alexiadou (2010), but a few characteristics will be stressed: argument structure nominals must be singular, be read eventively, and take arguments.

===== Examples =====
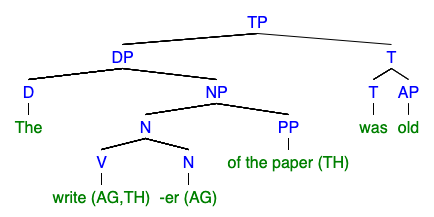
Agentive reading for nominal "writer"

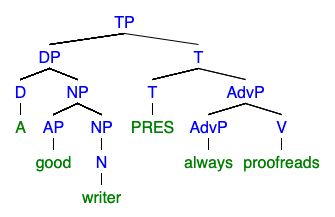
Instrumental reading for the word "writer"

Ambiguous nominalization exemplars
Affixation	Reading	Example
Nominalization by -ation		
examination	complex event (+AS)	The examination of the student driver lasted one hour.
examination	simple event (-AS)	The examination lasted one hour.
Nominalization by -er		
writer	agentive (+AS)	The writer of the paper was old.
writer	instrumental (-AS)	A good writer always proofreads.

Grimshaw observes that nominal argument structures are deficient and need a preposition phrase to take a syntactic argument. As seen in the examples above, the -ation nominalization has a complex eventive reading in which the nominal takes an argument (the student driver). Grimshaw's argumentation is that is possible only because of the presence of the preposition, of, which facilitates grammatical representation of argument structure and so the nominal can take its obligatory argument. The lack of preposition and argument in the simple event case is caused by the nominal having no argument structure and therefore not being a theta-marker a head that requires an argument, according to Grimshaw. Grimshaw expands on that difference and hypothesizes that complements of complex event nouns are obligatory and so adjuncts may actually syntactically behave similarly to arguments.

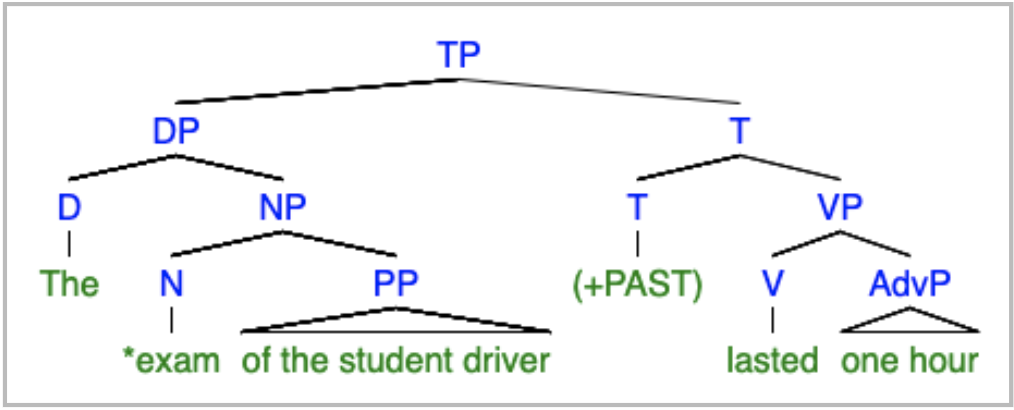
Complex event – noun. This tree illustrates that simple event nouns cannot take arguments because they have no argument structure.

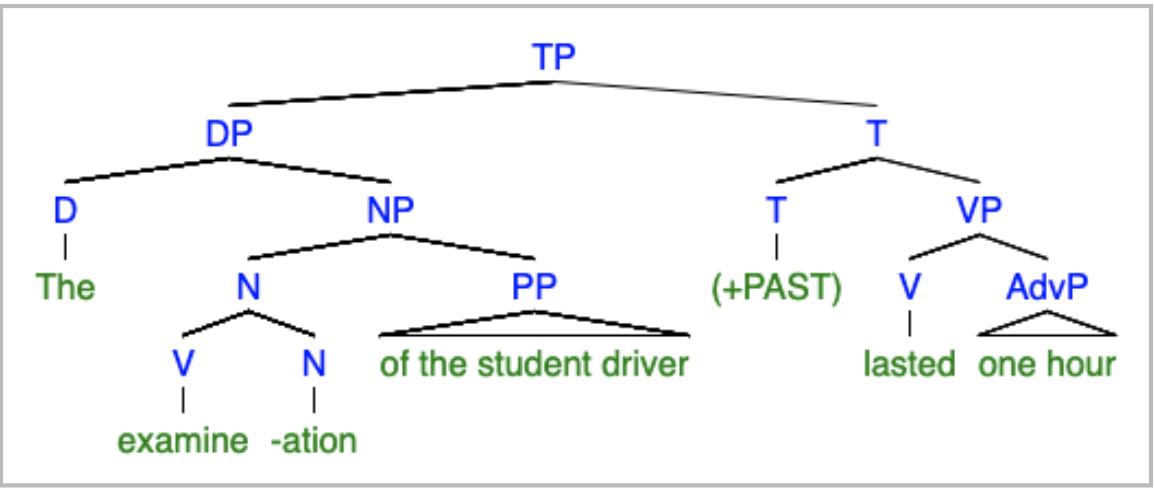
Complex event – nominalization. This tree illustrates that complex event nominals have a verb base that contributes argument structure to the internal structure of the nominalization, which allows it to take argument(s).

==== Complex versus simple event nominals ====
The distinction between complex and simple events is discussed by Lieber (2018) as being interpreted by Grimshaw to be a difference in the argument structure of the nominal type as a result of the syntactic context in which the nominalized word occurs.

The first instance of examination has a complex event interpretation because it is a derived nominal, which, according to Grimshaw, "inherits" the argument structure of the base verb, which must be satisfied by taking on the argument(s) that the verb would have. Specifically, examination is a deverbal noun, which is a nominal derived from a verb. The interpretation of the sentence "The examination of the student driver lasted one hour" is "The student driver was examined".

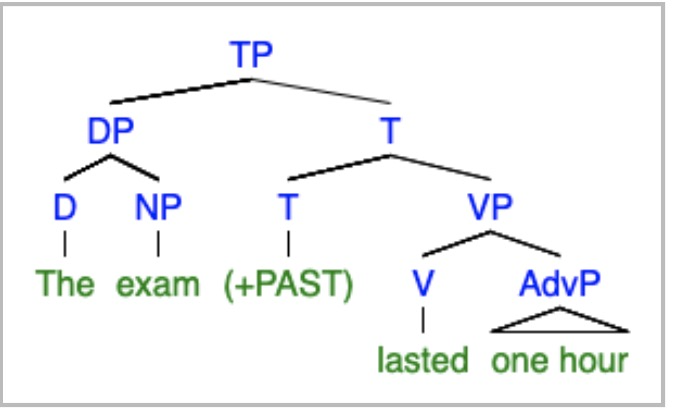
Simple event – noun. This tree illustrates the syntactic structure of simple event nouns.

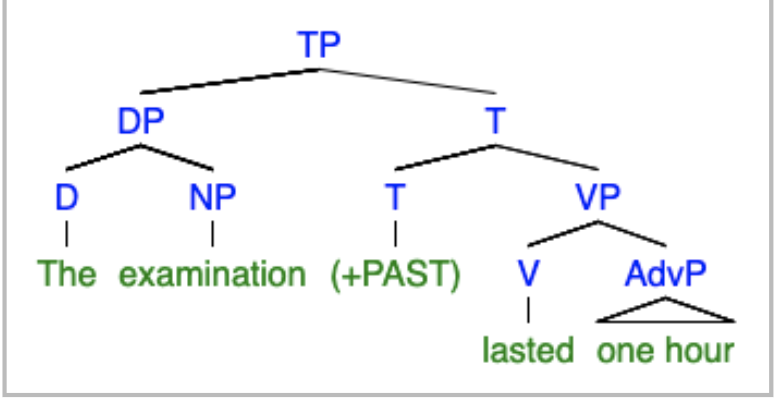
Simple event – nominalization. This tree illustrates that simple event nominals have a verb base that does not contribute argument structure to the internal structure of the nominalization and so the syntactic structure is the same as for simple event nouns above.

The second instance of examination has a simple event interpretation because while it is a derived nominal, according to Grimshaw, it does not "inherit" the verbal argument structure, and only the lexical/semantic content is projected. The suffix, -ation, is attached to a verb, "examine." The interpretation of the sentence "The examination lasted one hour" is "The exam took one hour."

Lieber (2018) refers to nominals that may take both simple and complex event interpretations as "polysemic."

==== Syntactic representation – Grimshaw (1994) ====
===== Subcategorization frames =====
The nominal examination in the contexts of an eventive or non-eventive reading has a different subcategorization frame.

====== Examination subcategorization frames ======
- Argument structure reading: examination, [ _(of DP)]
- Non-argument structure reading: examination, [ _VP]

The nominal writer, in terms of its agentive or instrumental reading also has different subcategorization frames.

====== Writer subcategorization frames ======
- Argument structure reading: writer, [ _(of DP)]
- Non-argument structure reading: writer, [ _VP]

=== Structural model analysis – Alexiadou (2001) ===
==== Analysis overview ====
Alexiadou (2001) supports the idea that the difference between nouns and verbs is located within the functional layers of its syntactic structure. She explains that initially, only verbs were thought to take arguments, but it was later proven that some nouns (process nouns) are systematically like verbs in their argument taking capacities and that others (result nouns) do not take arguments at all. Alexiadou (2001) claims that the key difference between nominals has been derived from variation in their functional structures.

==== Process and result nouns ====
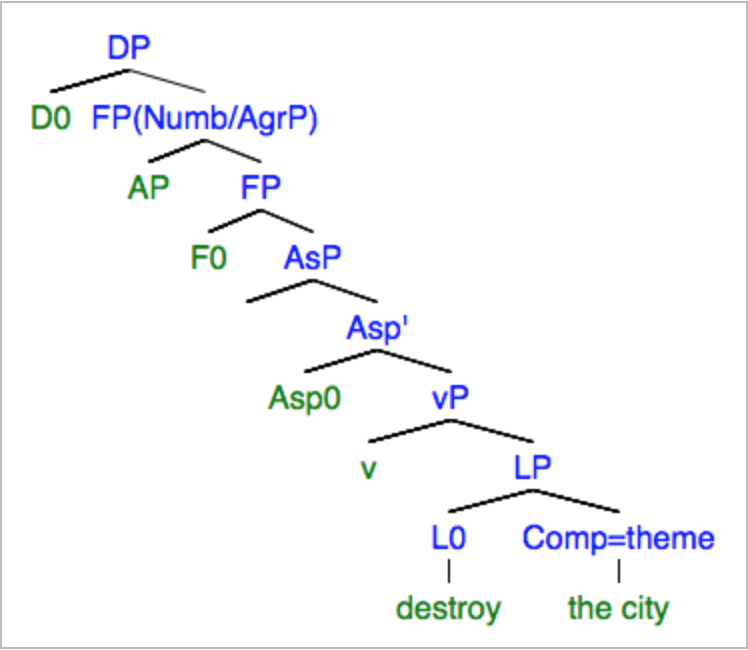
Process nominals tree structure. This tree represents the structural analysis for process nominals proposed by Alexiadou (2001).

Building on Grimshaw's (1990) analysis of argument structure and events, Alexiadou (2001) studies "complex events," which she refers to as "process nouns" or "event nouns," to denote an event, and "simple events," which she refers to as "result nouns," to indicate an output of an event.

Process and result noun exemplars
Noun type	Example
Process noun	The examination of the books
Process noun	The parents supervised the children's decoration of the cookies
Result noun	The frequent exams
Result noun	The decoration of the cookies were bright and colourful

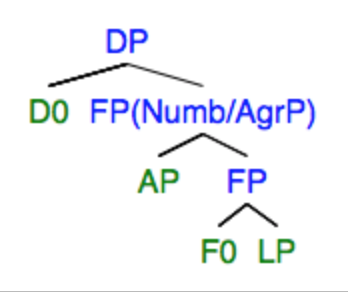
Result nominals tree structure. This tree represents the structural analysis for result nominals proposed by Alexidou (2001).

Deverbal noun

Alexiadou (2001) adopts a structural approach to accounting for eventative versus non-eventative interpretations of deverbal nominalization. Her analysis posits that both interpretations (process nouns and result nouns) are associated with a distinct syntactic structure. Alexiadou (2001) proposes that the functional structure of process nominals is much like that of verbs by including verb-like projections such as Aspect Phrase (AspP) and a light Voice Phrase (vP), but result nominals differ from verbs and have no Aspect Phrase or light Voice Phrase included in its functional structure therefore resembling the structure of an underived noun.

==== More on deverbal nominalization ====
Alexiadou (2001) further develops an explanation for the ambiguous nature of deverbal nominals. There are a number of ways through which that is shown, a notable technique being known as the Distributed Morphology framework. Ambiguity can be seen at both the semantic and syntactic level in deverbal nominals. At the semantic level, they may refer to either the events or number of entities, and from a syntactic point of view, its ambiguity stems from its ability to reveal the syntactic argument.

== See also ==
- Nominal (word)
- Pronominal
- Initial-stress-derived noun
- Verbal noun
