= Agent noun =

Noun that represents the agent of some action

In linguistics, an agent noun (in Latin, nomen agentis) is a word that is derived from another word denoting an action, and that identifies an entity that does that action. For example, driver is an agent noun formed from the verb drive.

Usually, derived in the above definition has the strict sense attached to it in morphology, that is the derivation takes as an input a lexeme (an abstract unit of morphological analysis) and produces a new lexeme. However, the classification of morphemes into derivational morphemes (see word formation) and inflectional ones is not generally a straightforward theoretical question, and different authors can make different decisions as to the general theoretical principles of the classification as well as to the actual classification of morphemes presented in a grammar of some language (for example, of the agent noun-forming morpheme).

== Words related to agent noun ==
Polish agental suffixes
-cz	bieg-ać 'to run'	bieg-acz 'runner'
-rz	pis-ać 'to write'	pis-arz 'writer'
-c	†kraw-ać 'to cut'	kraw-iec 'tailor'
-ca	daw-ać 'to give'	daw-ca 'giver'
-k	pis-ać 'to write'	pis-ak 'marker' (pen)
-k	skak-ać 'to jump'	skocz-ek 'jumper'
-k	chodz-ić 'to walk'	chodz-ik 'walker' (walking aid)
-ciel	nos-ić 'to carry'	nos-i-ciel 'carrier'
-nik	pracow-ać 'to work'	pracow-nik 'worker'
-nik	rob-ić 'to do' 'to work' rob-ot-a 'work'	rob-ot-nik 'worker'
-nik	praw-ić 'to orate' 'to moralize' praw-o 'law' praw-y 'right' 'righteous'	praw-nik 'lawyer'
-y	las 'forest' leś-nik 'forester'	leś-nicz-y 'forester'

An agentive suffix or agentive prefix is commonly used to form an agent noun from a verb. Examples:

- English: -er, -or, -ian, -ist
- Basque: -le (ikasle 'student' from ikasi 'learn')
- Chinese: ⋯者 (-zhě)
- Coptic: ⲣⲉϥ-, as in ⲣⲉϥⲙⲉⲓ (refmei 'loving person') from ⲙⲉⲓ (mei 'to love')
- Dutch: -er, -ende, -or, -iet, -ant, -aar
- Finnish: -ja/-jä (puhua 'speak', puhuja 'speaker'; lyödä 'hit', lyöjä 'hitter'); -uri (borrowed from '-or'/'er', probably via German)
- French: -(t)eur (m.); -(t)eure, -(t)euse, -trice, -iste (f.)
- Georgian: მე- ... -ე (me- ... -e), as in მებაღე (mebaghe 'gardener') from ბაღი (baghi 'garden'); otherwise the nominalization of the present participle (formed with many possible circumfixes) may occur.
- German: -er, -ler, -ner, -or, -ör, -ist, -it, -ant, -ent (may be compounded with the feminine ending -in)
- Greek: -ήρ, -τήρ
- Hungarian: no specific agentive suffix, the nominalization of present participle (suffix: -ó/-ő, according to vowel harmony) is used instead; examples: dolgozó ('worker'), szerelő ('repairman'), vezető ('leader', 'driver', 'electrical conductor')
- Irish: -óir (broad), -eoir (slender), -aí (broad), -í (slender)
- Khasi: prefix nong- or myn-, for example shad 'to dance', nongshad 'dancer'; tuh 'to steal', myntuh 'thief'
- Latin: -tor (m.) / -trix (f.) / -trum (n.) / -torius, -a, -um (adj.) as in arator / aratrix / aratrum / aratorius; -sor (m.) / -strix (f.) / -strum (n.) / -sorius, -a, -um (adj.) as in assessor / assestrix / *assestrum / assessorius; see also: -ens
- Maori: kai-
- Persian: ـنده (-ande): from present roots; as in گوینده (gūyande; 'speaker') from گفتن، گوی- (goftan, gūy-; to speak) / ـار (-ār) : from past roots; as in خواستار (x^{w}āstār; 'wanter') from خواستن، خواه- (x^{w}āstan, x^{w}āh-; 'to want'). / ـگر (-gar): from nouns; as in کارگر (kārgar; 'worker') from کار (kār; 'work').
- Polish: see table
- Quechua: -q (pukllay 'to play', pukllaq 'player')
- Russian: -чик or -ник (m.) / -чица or -ница (f.) as in ученик 'student'; -тель (m.) / -тельница (f.) as in учитель 'teacher'
- Spanish: -dor(a), -ero(a), -ista, -ario(a)
- Turkish: -ci (çiçekçi 'florist' from çiçek 'flower')
- Welsh: -wr (m.), -ores (f.)

== See also ==
- Agent (grammar)
- Nominalization
