= Morphological Productivity =

2001 book by Laurie Bauer

- Author: Laurie Bauer
- Language: English
- Subject: morphology
- Publisher: Cambridge University Press
- Publication date: 2001
- ISBN: 9781139428729

Morphological Productivity is a 2001 book by Laurie Bauer explaining productivity in English words.

== Synopsis ==
In the book's introduction, Bauer raises several questions which are examined in subsequent chapters. These questions are about the distinction between "productivity" and "creativity" (commonly understood as word-formation via, respectively, unconscious or semiconscious application of rules, and deliberate coining), the possibility of developing measures for productivity, the relationship between productivity and frequency or semantic coherence, and the causal relationship between unproductive processes and ungrammaticality.

In the next chapter, Bauer provides a historical overview of studies on productivity and examines such issues as whether productivity is an either/or matter or gradated, and the concepts of restricted and semi-productivity. He argues that frequency, semantic coherence, and the production of a new word appear to be prerequisites for productivity rather than productivity itself.

In chapter 3, Bauer tries to provide a "provisional" definition of productivity; and in chapter 4, he considers the psycholinguistic evidence about productivity. In chapter 5 he examines the role of corpora in studying and determining the productivity of morphological processes, and in chapter 6 he surveys the development and varying productivity of a number of historical and cross-language morphological phenomena. He also reviews several formulas proposed to calculate productivity and concludes that thus far there is no clear, unequivocal, or reliable method to determine the productivity of a morphological process, but in chapter 7 he offers a few useful observations about the productivity of processes.
