= English Word-Formation =

- Author: Laurie Bauer
- Language: English
- Subject: word formation
- Publisher: Cambridge University Press
- Publication date: 1983
- ISBN: 9780521284929

English Word-Formation is a 1983 book by Laurie Bauer in which the author considers the relationship between word-formation and other areas of linguistics without trying to provide a fully-fledged theory of word-formation.

The book has been credited as the "first detailed study of Present-Day English word-formation".

== Content ==
The book is composed of nine chapters in which he discusses English word-formation as well as what Bauer sees as its main problem areas, which he defines as including restricted productivity, lexicalization, syntax, and semantics. English Word-Formation begins with an introduction section and moves into its next chapter, which discusses some basic concepts. From there the chapters discuss productivity, phonological issues in word-formation, syntactic and semantic issues in word-formation, an outline of English word-formation, and theory and practice before coming to the book's conclusion.

== Reception ==
István Kenesei reviewed the book in 1985 for Studies in Language, where he criticized the book as not living up to the criteria of other books published through the Cambridge Textbooks in Linguistics line, which he felt was "partly out of sheer ill fortune, but mostly because of the failure of the approach he has chosen." Scholar Susanne Mühleisen has also criticized English Word-Formation as "[resting] on rather thin and arbitrary data".

In contrast, Dieter Kastovsky praised English Word-Formation as the best introduction of the English word-formation at the time, praising it as an "extensive and critical survey of the state of the art".
