= Lexicalist hypothesis =

Hypothesis in linguistics

The lexicalist hypothesis is a hypothesis proposed by Noam Chomsky in which he claims that syntactic transformations only can operate on syntactic constituents. It says that the system of grammar that assembles words is separate and different from the system of grammar that assembles phrases out of words.

There are two versions of the hypothesis: weak and strong. In the weak version the transformations could not operate on the derivational words; in the strong approach, the transformations can operate on neither derivational nor inflectional words.

The lexicalist hypothesis is a response to generative semanticians who use transformations in the derivation of complex words.

There are objections to the hypothesis such as distributed morphology.

The lexical integrity hypothesis is a subset of the lexicalist hypothesis.

== History ==
In the 1950s, Noam Chomsky introduced generative grammar into the world of linguistics and his theory quickly became widely accepted and popular. He mentioned multiple theories of grammar but he favoured the theory to which he gave a name of transformational generative grammar in particular. Transformational generative grammar states that sentences are formed using the standard generative grammar rules to form what is called a deep structure and from there, rules called transformations are used to change this structure by adding, moving, changing or even deleting material from the present structure.

In 1960, Robert B. Lees brought up a theory that derived nominals are all deverbal and not sentential. In other words, the theory states that nominalizations are not derived from verbs or sentences. Lees' theory prevailed until Noam Chomsky released Remarks on Nominalization in 1970. It was in Remarks on Nominalization, that Chomsky proposed the lexicalist hypothesis. Both Lees' and Chomsky's theories are in support of generative grammar.

== Theory ==
The lexicalist hypothesis can be dissected into the following aspects.

=== Idiosyncrasy argument ===
The relationship between derived nominals and the corresponding verb from which it is derived, is idiosyncratic and highly irregular. This means morphological transformations of the verb into its derived nominals have no regulations.

For example, there is no apparent morphology-to-meaning link between the verb profess (meaning 'to claim or declare openly'), and its derived nominals such as professor (meaning ‘university teacher’) or profession (meaning 'career'). In this example, changing verbs to their derived nominals involves the addition of '-or' and '-ion', which do not inherently add a new dimension of meaning to the verb, indicating that these morphological additions are idiosyncratic, and not systematic.

Another example would be the verb ignore (refuse to acknowledge), and its derived nominals ignorance (lack of knowledge) and ignoramus (a stupid person). The morphological transformations made to the verb ignore are largely idiosyncratic, and do not inherently contribute to the meaning.

=== Internal structure argument ===
Structures in which derived nominals occur resemble that of usual noun phrases, rather than following the structures of the verb phrase that the original verb sits in.

Using the verb refuse and its derived nominal refusal for instance:

- We refuse the offer. (Verb phrase)
- *We refusal the offer. (Replacing the verb with its corresponding derived nominal in the same verb phrase structure)

[An asterisk (*) in linguistics denotes an ungrammatical form.]

The derived nominal does not occur in the structure of the corresponding verb in which it is derived from. Instead, it should occur in the structure of a generic noun phrase, which can contain determiners, adjectives, and prepositional phrases:

- The unrelenting quest of the three musketeers. (Noun phrase)
- The stupid refusal of the offer. (Using a derived nominal in a structure similar to a generic noun phrase)

=== Frozen structure argument ===
Derived nominals correspond to base structures, that is, to treat derived nominals as deep structure nouns.

According to Chomsky, (a) and (b) are preferable to (c) and (d).

(a) His looking up of the information.
(b) His defining away of the problem.
(c) *His looking of the information up.
(d) *His defining of the problem away.

With this example, Chomsky demonstrates that particle shift, a process in which the phrase is split up and shifted to another part of the sentence, is not applicable for derived nominal phrases.

Other processes that cannot be applied to derived nominals include:

- Dative shift
- There-insertion: Inserting "there" into a derived nominal phrase.
- Transforming a raising to an object
- Psych-Movement: Moving the object of the psych-verb (a verb that expresses a mental state or event, also called a mental verb) into the subject position, while the original subject is made into a prepositional phrase.
- Tough-Movement

Originally, these processes could not be applied to base nouns, and therefore, according to the frozen structure argument, they cannot be applied to derived nominals as well.

== Criticisms ==
Many theorists have come up with examples that seem to undermine the strength of lexicalist hypothesis.

Advocates of the lexicalist hypothesis posit certain properties of syntactic words as evidence for a pre-syntactic word-formation module. Michael Barrie (2012) of Sogang University discusses these properties and argues that none of them presents a solid case for positing a word-building module distinct from syntax.

For example, a syntactic analysis of word formation predicts that the components of a syntactically formed word should have the same syntactic properties as when it appears as an independent word, which can be counted as the property of inheritance. In this regard, Ackema & Neeleman (2004) address the derivation of the word driver. If the verb driver is syntactically constructed from the verb drive and the nominalizer -er, the verb should maintain its verbal properties and be able to take an object, resulting in the ungrammatical *driver a truck. Then Ackema & Neeleman (2004) come up with various structures that defend this property. Barrie (2012) examines these structures and concludes that their argument in terms of inheritance does not present a valid argument in support of an independent, pre-syntactic word-forming module.

Bruening (2018) argues that lexicalist hypothesis, mainly the part that concerns lexical integrity hypothesis, which assumes that words are separate units that are inserted into syntactic structures, is fundamentally incorrect. He points out three ways in which he believes that the lexicalist hypothesis is mistaken in its view of grammar.

=== Error 1: Phrasal Syntax Can Feed Word Formation ===
According to the lexicalist hypothesis, interaction between the word and phrase systems is unidirectional: the output of the word-formation system provides the input to the phrasal syntax, and not vice versa.

(1)

a. She had that don’t-you-dare! look.
b. She had that I’m-so-proud-of-myself look.

(1) shows that the phrases that constitute the first member of these compounds MUST be put together by the syntax, because they have the form that the syntax requires. As in 1a, they can have the form of a declarative. However, if the first member of the compound violates rules and constraints of the phrasal syntax, the result is ill-formed, as in (2).

(2)

a. *She had that you-don’t-dare! look. (obligatory inversion with negative imperative)
b. *She had that myself-is-so-proud-of-me look. (reflexive bad as subject)

If these phrases were not put together by the phrasal syntax but by some other mechanism, that mechanism would have to precisely duplicate the constraints of the phrasal syntax.

=== Error 2: Phrasal Syntax Has Access To Subword Units ===
Bruening (2018) also argues that the lexicalist hypothesis is incorrect in its assertion that the phrasal syntax has no access to subword units.

(3)

a. You can pre- or re-mix it.
b. *They produce cranber- and dai-ry products.

(4)

a. bi- and a-sexual
b. birth- and adopted sons
c. *bi- and ma-son paraphernalia (bison paraphernalia and mason paraphernalia)

Bruening analyzes that in (4), for example, that the strings bi- and a-, as well as the string son, can stand alone. However, (4c) does not function because the morphemes bi-, ma- (which sounds identical to a-), and son are not distinct in these terms. This means that ellipsis can't only work with phonological or prosodic strings; it also requires access to morphological structure.

=== Error 3: Morphology And Syntax Obey The Same Principles ===
According to the lexicalist hypothesis, as distinct components of grammar, the word-formation system and the phrasal system can be assumed to follow different principles. Bruening looks at some of the claimed distinctions between word formation and phrasal syntax, and concludes that none of those distinctions are real, and therefore morphology and syntax follow the same rules.
