= Morphological derivation =

Forming a new word on the basis of an existing one

Morphological derivation, in linguistics, is the process of forming a new word from an existing word, often by adding a prefix or suffix, such as un- or -ness. For example, unhappy and happiness derive from the root word happy.

It is differentiated from inflection, which is the modification of a word to form different grammatical categories without changing its core meaning or lexical category: determines, determining, and determined are from the root determine.

== Derivational patterns ==
Derivational morphology often involves the addition of a derivational suffix or other affix. Such an affix usually applies to words of one lexical category (part of speech) and changes them into words of another such category. For example, one effect of the English derivational suffix -ly is to change an adjective into an adverb (slow → slowly).

Here are examples of English derivational patterns and their suffixes:

- adjective-to-noun: -ness (slow → slowness)
- adjective-to-verb: -en (weak → weaken)
- adjective-to-adjective: -ish (red → reddish)
- adjective-to-adverb: -ly (personal → personally)
- noun-to-adjective: -al (recreation → recreational)
- noun-to-verb: -fy (glory → glorify)
- verb-to-adjective: -able (drink → drinkable)
- verb-to-noun (abstract): -ance (deliver → deliverance)
- verb-to-noun (agent): -er (write → writer)

However, derivational affixes do not necessarily alter the lexical category; they may change merely the meaning of the base and leave the category unchanged. A prefix (write → rewrite; lord → overlord) rarely changes the lexical category in English. The prefix un- applies to adjectives (healthy → unhealthy) and some verbs (do → undo) but rarely to nouns. A few exceptions are the derivational prefixes en- and be-. En- (replaced by em- before labials) is usually a transitive marker on verbs, but it can also be applied to adjectives and nouns to form transitive verbs: circle (verb) → encircle (verb) but rich (adj) → enrich (verb), large (adj) → enlarge (verb), rapture (noun) → enrapture (verb), slave (noun) → enslave (verb).

When derivation occurs without any change to the word, such as in the conversion of the noun breakfast into the verb to breakfast, it's known as conversion, or zero derivation.

Derivation that results in a noun may be called nominalization. It may involve the use of an affix (such as with employ → employee), or it may occur via conversion (such as with the derivation of the noun run from the verb to run). In contrast, a derivation resulting in a verb may be called verbalization (such as from the noun butter to the verb to butter).

Some words have specific exceptions to these patterns. For example, inflammable actually means flammable, and de-evolution is spelled with only one e, as devolution.

== Derivation and inflection ==
Derivation can be contrasted with inflection, in that derivation produces a new word (a distinct lexeme), whereas inflection produces grammatical variants (or forms) of the same word.

Generally speaking, inflection applies in more or less regular patterns to all members of a part of speech (for example, nearly every English verb adds -s for the third person singular present tense), while derivation follows less consistent patterns (for example, the nominalizing suffix -ity can be used with the adjectives modern and dense, but not with open or strong). However, derivations and inflections can share homonyms, that being, morphemes that have the same sound, but not the same meaning. For example, when the affix -er is added to an adjective, as in small-er, it acts as an inflection, but when added to a verb, as in cook-er, it acts as a derivation.

A derivation can produce a lexeme with a different part of speech but does not necessarily. For example, the derivation of the word uncommon from common + un- (a derivational morpheme) does not change its part of speech (both are adjectives).

An important distinction between derivational and inflectional morphology lies in the content/function of a listeme. Derivational morphology changes both the meaning and the content of a listeme, while inflectional morphology doesn't change the meaning, but changes the function.

A non-exhaustive list of derivational morphemes in English: -ful, -able, im-, un-, -ing, -er.

A non-exhaustive list of inflectional morphemes in English: -er, -est, -ing, -en, -ed, -s.

== Derivation and other types of word formation ==
Derivation can be contrasted with other types of word formation such as compounding.

Derivational affixes are bound morphemes – they are meaningful units, but can only normally occur when attached to another word. In that respect, derivation differs from compounding by which free morphemes are combined (lawsuit, Latin professor). It also differs from inflection in that inflection does not create new lexemes but new word forms (table → tables; open → opened).

== Productivity ==
Derivational patterns differ in the degree to which they can be called productive. A productive pattern or affix is one that is commonly used to produce novel forms. For example, the negating prefix un- is more productive in English than the alternative in-; both of them occur in established words (such as unusual and inaccessible), but faced with a new word which does not have an established negation, a native speaker is more likely to create a novel form with un- than with in-. The same thing happens with suffixes. For example, if comparing two words Thatcherite and Thatcherist, the analysis shows that both suffixes -ite and -ist are productive and can be added to proper names, moreover, both derived adjectives are established and have the same meaning. But the suffix -ist is more productive and, thus, can be found more often in word formation not only from proper names.

== See also ==
- Agglutination
- Collocation
- Inflection
- Nominalization
- Word formation
- Word root
