= Functional morpheme =

Morpheme whose only role is to mark grammatical function; antonym of content morpheme

In linguistics, functional morphemes, also sometimes referred to as functors, are building blocks for language acquisition. A functional morpheme (as opposed to a content morpheme) is a morpheme which simply modifies the meaning of a word, rather than supplying the root meaning. Functional morpheme are generally considered a closed class, which means that new functional morphemes cannot normally be created.

Functional morphemes can be bound, such as verbal inflectional morphology (e.g., progressive -ing, past tense -ed), or nominal inflectional morphology (e.g., plural -s), or free, such as conjunctions (e.g., and, or), prepositions (e.g., of, by, for, on), articles (e.g., a, the), and pronouns (e.g., she, him, it, you, mine). In English, functional morphemes typically consist of consonants that receive low stress such as /s,z,w,ð/. These phonemes are seen in conjunction with short vowels, usually schwa /ə/. Gerken (1994) points out that functional morphemes are indicators of phrases. So, if the word the appears, a noun phrase would be expected to follow. The same occurs with verb phrases and adjective phrases and their corresponding word endings. Functional morphemes tend to occur at the beginning or end of each phrase in a sentence. The previous example of beginning a noun phrase with the indicates a functional morpheme, as does ending a verb phrase with -ed.

== Early Language acquisition ==
Children begin to use functional morphemes in their speech as early as two years old. Functional morphemes encode grammatical meaning within words, but children don't outwardly show their understanding of this. Recently, linguistics have begun to discover that children do recognize functional morphemes when it was previously thought otherwise. LouAnn Gerken at the University of Arizona has done extensive research on language development in children. She argues that even though children may not actually produce functional morphemes in speech, they do appear to understand their use within sentences.

=== In English ===
In order to determine if a child does indeed recognize functional morphemes, Gerken conducted an experiment. This experiment was conducted in English and focused on words that were not said, rather than words that were said. She came up with sentences in which weak syllables were used, as well as nonsense (or nonce) words. Variations of the verb pushes was used and then altered to make nonce words like bazes, pusho, and bazo. The second variation used was the noun phrase the dog which was changed to na dep, or some combination of the correct and incorrect words. Through this experiment, Gerken discovered that children tended to not say English function morphemes more than the nonsense words. This is because the actual functional morphemes contained less stress than the nonsense words. Due to the nonsense words containing more stress, children were able to say them more often even though they were not real words in English. One reason why this happens is because functors show an increase in the complexity of sentence structures. So, rather than saying the complex sentences with weakly stressed English words, children tend to say the nonsense sentences more frequently due to their lack of linguistic complexity.

=== In French ===
In children who spoke French, it was discovered that they acted similarly to the children that spoke English. An experiment was conducted by Rushen Shi and Melanie Lepage on children who spoke Quebec French. They decided to take the French determiner des, meaning 'the', and compare it with the words mes meaning 'my', and kes (a nonce word). The two verbs used were preuve 'proof' and sangle 'saddle'. The verbs then had functors attached to them and appeared in variation with the three noun phrases. Compared to English functors which can be identified through stress, French functors are identified through syllables. This difference made an important distinction between English and French language learners because Shi found that French speaking children learn functors at an earlier age than English speaking children. In the study conducted it was found that French speaking children were able to identify the functors. This is thought to be because French has a higher frequency of noun phrases which leads children to pay more attention to functors.

=== In other languages ===
Research has been done in other languages such as German and Dutch. So far most languages tend to act similar to English, in that children who are acquiring language learn functional morphemes even though it might not be outwardly apparent.

== Neural processing of functional morphemes ==
Lee et.al. conducted a study on adults who had surgery within six months prior to test for their knowledge of functional morphemes and to determine where in the brain these processes occur. The study revolved around the participants' ability to produce the correct form of the verb talk. By doing so, the researchers were able to determine the specific area where the processing of functional morphemes occur. They observed grey and white matter in the brain and found that the processing of function morphemes occurs in the left temporoparietal junction (TPJ). They also discovered that if the adult had received damage to their post-superior temporal gyrus (P-STG), then they would have problems producing functional morphemes in the future. Lee et.al. concluded that functional morphemes are required for producing lexically complex words and sentences, and that damage to the P-STG can result in adults having issues with these processes.

== Bootstrapping ==
The linguistic theory of bootstrapping refers to how infants come to learn language through the process of language acquisition. By learning functional morphemes, children are unconsciously bootstrapping themselves for other linguistic processes. This includes learning words in general, grammar, the meaning of words, and how phrases work. Through several studies examining children's language acquisition, it was found that children do use functional morphemes to help them develop other parts of their speech.
