= Laurie Bauer =

British linguist

- Born: Laurence James Bauer; 9 August 1949 (age 76)
- Education: University of Edinburgh (PhD)
- Known for: works on English morphology
- Awards: Royal Society of New Zealand's Humanities medal
- Scientific career
- Fields: Morphology, Word formation
- Institutions: Victoria University of Wellington
- Doctoral advisor: Duncan McMillan
- Other academic advisors: John Lyons, David Abercrombie, Gill Brown, Keith Brown, John Laver, Jim Miller, John Anderson

Laurence James Bauer FRSNZ (born 9 August 1949) is a British linguist and Emeritus Professor of Linguistics at Victoria University of Wellington. He is known for his expertise on morphology and word formation. Bauer was an editor of the journal Word Structure. In 2017 he was awarded the Royal Society of New Zealand's Humanities medal.

== Life ==
Bauer was brought up in Yorkshire, where his parents moved when he was six years old. He attended King James's Grammar School and was then accepted at Edinburgh in 1967 to do a course in French language with general linguistics and phonetics. In the second year, he started linguistics. Bauer was admitted as a PhD student in October 1972. He finished his PhD in 1975, presenting the thesis Nominal compounds in Danish, English and French, and started teaching in the English Department at Odense University, Denmark. He married Winifred Bauer in 1976.

Bauer is a contributor to The Cambridge Grammar of the English Language.

== Books ==
- Andersen, Erik & Laurie Bauer 1975. Engelske Udtaleøvelser ('English Pronunciation Exercises'). With accompanying tapes. Copenhagen: Gyldendal
- The Grammar of Nominal Compounding with special reference to Danish, English and French, Odense University Press, 1978
- American English Pronunciation, with J.M. Dienhart, H.H. Hartvigson & L. Kvistgaard Jakobsen, Copenhagen: Gyldendal, 1980
- English Word-Formation, Cambridge University Press, 1983
- Introducing Linguistic Morphology, Edinburgh University Press, 1988
- Watching English Change, Longman, 1994
- Vocabulary, Routledge, 1998
- Morphological Productivity, Cambridge University Press, 2001
- An Introduction to International Varieties of English, Edinburgh University Press, 2002
- A Glossary of Morphology, Edinburgh University Press, 2004
- Language Matters, With Janet Holmes and Paul Warren, Palgrave, 2006
- The Linguistics Student's Handbook, Edinburgh University Press, 2007. ISBN 978-0-7486-2758-5 (hardback); ISBN 978-0-7486-2759-2 (paperback)
- Q and Eh. Questions and answers on language with a Kiwi twist, with Dianne Bardsley, Janet Holmes & Paul Warren, Random House, 2011. [This book reprinted articles which first appeared in the Dominion Post newspaper from October 2007]
- Beginning Linguistics, Palgrave Macmillan, 2012
- The Oxford Reference Guide to English Morphology, with Rochelle Lieber and Ingo Plag, Oxford University Press, 2013
- Compounds and Compounding, Cambridge University Press, 2017
- Rethinking Morphology, Edinburgh University Press, 2019

== See also ==
- Peter Hugoe Matthews
- Heinz Giegerich
