= Geert Booij =

Dutch linguist

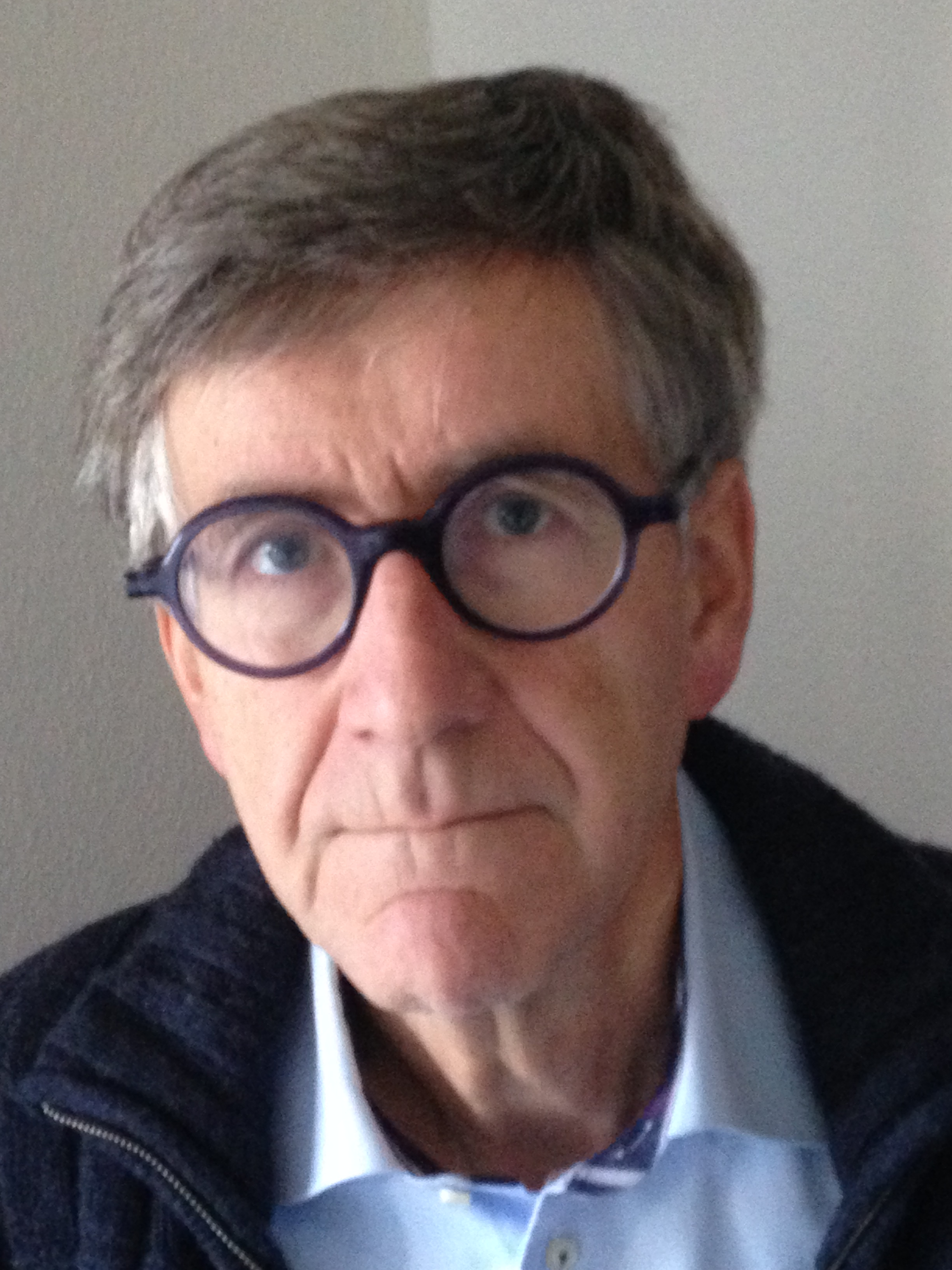
- Booij in 2017
- Born: 1947 (age 78–79); Hoogeveen, Netherlands
- Education: University of Amsterdam (PhD) University of Groningen (MA)
- Known for: Construction grammar; Construction Morphology; Cognitive linguistics; Dutch phonology
- Awards: Humboldt Research Award (2011)
- Scientific career
- Fields: Linguistics
- Workplaces: University of Leiden (2005–present); Vrije Universiteit Amsterdam (1981–2005); University of Amsterdam (1971–1981)
- Thesis: Dutch Morphology: A Study of Word Formation in Generative Grammar (1977)
- Website: geertbooij.com

Geert Evert Booij (Dutch pronunciation: [ɣeːrd ˈboːi]; (Note: In isolation, Geert is pronounced [ɣeːrt].) born 1947) is a Dutch linguist, and emeritus professor of linguistics at the University of Leiden. He is credited as the creator of construction morphology.

== Career ==
Booij previously taught at the Vrije Universiteit and University of Amsterdam, and he has been a member of the National Research Council for Humanities since 1997. He was the Dean of the Faculty of Arts at the University of Leiden between 2005 and 2007. He is a winner of Humboldt Research Award and an Honorary Member of the Linguistic Society of America.

== Books ==
- The Phonology of Dutch (The Phonology of the World's Languages), Oxford University Press, 1995.
- The Morphology of Dutch, Oxford University Press. First edition 2002; second edition 2019.
- The Grammar of Words: An Introduction to Linguistic Morphology (Oxford Textbooks in Linguistics), Oxford University Press. First edition 2005; second edition 2007; third edition 2012.
- Construction Morphology (Oxford Linguistics), Oxford University Press, 2010.
- Yearbook of Morphology (ed.)
