= Construction morphology =

Construction morphology (CM) is a morphological theory aimed at a better understanding of the grammar of words, as well as the relation between syntax, morphology, and the lexicon. Susanne Z. Riehemann developed the theoretical foundations in her masters thesis in 1993, which was later published as Riehemann (1998). She named her approach type-based morphology. It was fully formalized in the framework of Head-Driven Phrase Structure Grammar but basically used ideas and concepts that later became popular within Construction Grammar. Geert Booij published work using and extending Riehemann's ideas starting in the 2000s under the name of Construction Morphology.
