= Andrea Sims =

American linguist

Andrea D. Sims

Academic background
- Education: The Ohio State University (PhD)
- Doctoral advisor: Brian D. Joseph

Academic work
- Discipline: Linguistics
- Sub-discipline: Morphology, Slavic Linguistics
- Website: OSU faculty page

Andrea D. Sims is a linguist and professor in the Department of Linguistics at The Ohio State University (OSU). She researches morphological theory, especially inflection, focusing primarily on the Slavic languages.

== Biography ==
Sims earned her PhD in linguistics at The Ohio State University in 2006 with a dissertation entitled, "Minding the gaps: Inflectional defectiveness in a paradigmatic theory".

Sims worked at Northwestern University as a postdoctoral fellow from 2006 until 2008, before starting at Ohio State in 2008 as an assistant professor, and she was promoted to the position of Professor in 2024.

== Awards and honors ==
Sims has received major grant funding from the National Science Foundation for her academic work, most recently for the project Neural discovery of abstract inflectional structure (2022–2026).

In 2025, Sims was elected as a Fellow of the Linguistic Society of America.

Sims serves as a co-Editor of the journal Word Structure.

== Selected publications ==
- Haspelmath, Martin; Sims, Andrea D. (28 October 2013). Understanding Morphology. Routledge. doi:10.4324/9780203776506. ISBN 978-1-4441-1711-0.
- Sims, Andrea D. (2015). Inflectional Defectiveness | Cambridge Studies in Linguistics. Cambridge University Press. ISBN 978-1-107-04584-2.
- Andrea D. Sims. 2023. Defectiveness. In The Wiley Blackwell companion to morphology, edited by Peter Ackema, Sabrina Bendjaballah, Eulàlia Bonet, and Antonio Fábregas. Wiley Blackwell.
- Sara Court, Andrea D. Sims and Micha Elsner. 2023. Analogy in contact: Modeling Maltese plural inflection. Proceedings of the Society for Computation in Linguistics 6: 35–46.
- Mark Aronoff and Andrea D. Sims. 2023. The relational nature of morphology. In Linguistic morphology in the mind and brain, edited by Davide Crepaldi, 7-25. London: Routledge.
