= The Oxford Reference Guide to English Morphology =

2013 reference work

- Author: Laurie Bauer, Rochelle Lieber, Ingo Plag
- Language: English
- Subject: morphology
- Publisher: Oxford University Press
- Publication date: 2013
- Pages: 691
- ISBN: 9780199579266

The Oxford Reference Guide to English Morphology is a 2013 book by Laurie Bauer, Rochelle Lieber and Ingo Plag in which the authors provide "a comprehensive reference volume covering the whole of contemporary English morphology". In 2015 the authors were the recipients of the Linguistic Society of America's Leonard Bloomfield Book Award for writing the book.
