= Word Structure =

- Discipline: Linguistic morphology
- Language: English
- Edited by: Erich Round, Andrea Sims, Peter Arkadiev, Richard Huyghe

Publication details
- History: 2008–present
- Publisher: Edinburgh University Press (United Kingdom)
- Frequency: Biannual

Standard abbreviations
- ISO 4: Word Struct.

Indexing
- ISSN: 1750-1245 (print); 1755-2036 (web)
- OCLC no.: 276359739

Links
- Journal homepage; Archives

Word Structure is an international academic journal covering linguistic morphology and all related disciplines. It is published twice-yearly, in April and October, by Edinburgh University Press and was founded in 2008 under the editorship of Laurie Bauer (Victoria University of Wellington), Heinz Giegerich (University of Edinburgh), and Gregory T. Stump (University of Kentucky). The current editors are Erich Round (University of Surrey and University of Queensland), Andrea Sims (Ohio State University), Peter Arkadiev (University of Potsdam) and Richard Huyghe (University of Fribourg).

The journal is both synchronic and diachronic. It aims to understand the nature of words, particularly their morphology, syntax and phonology, as well as the social and psychological aspects of language, amongst other goals.
