= Content morpheme =

A content morpheme or contentive morpheme is a root that forms the semantic core of a major class word. Content morphemes have lexical denotations that are not dependent on the context or on other morphemes. For instance, in English, the abstract noun beauty (already a fused form with an incorporated suffix) may mean 'pleasing quality'. Adding the causative verbal suffix -fy (a functional morpheme) produces the verb beautify 'to make pleasing'. By adding the suffix -ful (another functional morpheme), the adjective beautiful is formed. Further adding the adverbializer -ly (yet another functional morpheme) produces the adverb beautifully. The various functional morphemes surrounding the semantic core are able to modify the use of the root through derivation, but do not alter the lexical denotation of the root as somehow 'pleasing' or 'satisfying'.

Most or all major class words include at least one content morpheme; compounds may contain two or more content morphemes. In addition to content morphemes, major class words frequently (but not obligatorily) include one or more functional morphemes affixed to the root(s).

Some languages, such as Kharia, can be analyzed as having a single major word class composed of semantic bases or content morphemes. Thus, the distinction between nouns, verbs, and adjectives in such languages is entirely morphological (realized through the concatenation of functional morphemes), rather than lexical (having separate entries in the lexicon for each of the major word classes).
