= Ingo Plag =

German linguist

Ingo Plag (born 2 August 1962) is a German linguist and Professor of English Language and Linguistics at the Heinrich-Heine-Universität, Düsseldorf. In 2015 he and co-authors Laurie Bauer and Rochelle Lieber were the recipients of the Linguistic Society of America's Leonard Bloomfield Book Award for their 2013 work, The Oxford Reference Guide to English Morphology. He is a co-editor of Morphology.
