= Morphology (journal) =

- Discipline: linguistic morphology
- Language: English
- Edited by: Ingo Plag, Olivier Bonami, Ana R. Luís

Publication details
- History: 2006–present
- Publisher: Springer Netherlands (Netherlands)
- Frequency: Quarterly

Standard abbreviations
- ISO 4: Morphology

Indexing
- ISSN: 1871-5621 (print); 1871-5656 (web)

Links
- Journal homepage; Online access

Morphology is a peer-reviewed academic journal in linguistic morphology published by the Springer Netherlands since 2006. Its editors-in-chief are Ingo Plag, Olivier Bonami and Ana R. Luís. The previous volumes were published under the title Yearbook of Morphology edited by Geert Booij.
