= Morphological analysis =

Morphological analysis may refer to:

- Morphological analysis (problem-solving) or general morphological analysis, a method for exploring all possible solutions to a multi-dimensional, non-quantified problem
- Analysis of morphology (linguistics), the internal structure of words
  - Morphological parsing, conducted by computers to extract morphological information from a given wordform
- Analysis of morphology (biology), the form and structure of organisms and their specific features
- Mathematical morphology, a theory and technique for analysis and processing of images and geometrical structures
- Morphological dictionary, a computational linguistic resource that contains correspondences between surface form and lexical forms of words
