= Rochelle Lieber =

American linguist

Rochelle Lieber is an American Professor of Linguistics at the University of New Hampshire. She is a linguist known for her work in morphology, the syntax-morphology interface, and morphology and lexical semantics.

== Career ==
After receiving an artium baccalaureus degree in anthropology from Vassar (1976), Lieber studied linguistics at the Massachusetts Institute of Technology, receiving her Ph.D. degree in 1980. Her dissertation, On the Organization of the Lexicon, was written under the direction of Morris Halle. It was in this work that she proposed "feature percolation," a mechanism by which the properties of lexical items are inherited by their larger constituent structures, and which she articulates more fully in Lieber 1992 (77ff). Syntacticians and morphologists have made use of the concept of feature percolation in many different ways since Lieber's first proposal.

Professor Lieber has taught at the University of New Hampshire since 1981. She received the University of New Hampshire Award for Excellence in Teaching in 1991.

Lieber is the author of Deconstructing Morphology: Word Formation in Syntactic Theory (Chicago: Chicago University Press, 1992), an influential attempt to reduce morphology to the syntactic principles of government and binding theory. In Deconstructing Morphology, Lieber makes two statements that are often quoted: "no one has yet succeeded in deriving the properties of words and the properties of sentences from the same principles of grammar," and "the conceptually simplest possible theory would then be the one in which all morphology is done as a part of syntax" (Lieber 1992: 21).

Lieber's monograph, Morphology and Lexical Semantics (Cambridge: Cambridge University Press, 2004), is the first attempt to develop a theory of the lexical semantics of derivation and compounding.

In addition to several monographs, she is the author of numerous articles and book chapters on morphology.

== Honors ==
She served as the co-editor of the Wiley-Blackwell Language and Linguistics Compass.

In 2015 she and co-authors Laurie Bauer and Ingo Plag were the recipients of the Linguistic Society of America's Leonard Bloomfield Book Award for their 2013 work, The Oxford Reference Guide to English Morphology.

== Books ==
- Lieber, R. 1987. An integrated theory of autosegmental processes. Albany: State University of New York Press. ISBN 0-88706-509-0
- Lieber, R. 1990. On the organization of the lexicon. Outstanding Dissertations in Linguistics. New York: Garland. ISBN 0-8240-1890-7
- Lieber, R. 1992. Deconstructing morphology: Word formation in syntactic theory. Chicago: University of Chicago Press. ISBN 0-226-48063-1
- Lieber, R. 2004. Morphology and lexical semantics. Cambridge: Cambridge University Press. ISBN 0-521-83171-7
- Štekauer, P. & R. Lieber, eds. 2005. Handbook of word-formation. Dordrecht, The Netherlands: Springer. ISBN 1-4020-3597-7
- Lieber, R. & P. Štekauer, eds. 2009. Handbook of Compounding. Oxford: Oxford University Press. ISBN 978-0-19-921987-2
- Bauer, L., Lieber, R., Plag, I. 2013. The Oxford Reference Guide to English Morphology. Oxford: Oxford University Press. ISBN 978-0-19-957926-6
- Lieber, R. 2016. English nouns: The ecology of nominalization. Cambridge: Cambridge University Press. Hardback ISBN 9781107161375; paperback ISBN 9781316613870.
