= Heinz Giegerich =

Heinz Joachim Giegerich is a Scottish linguist of German nationality, and Emeritus Professor of English Linguistics in the School of Philosophy, Psychology and Language Science of the University of Edinburgh, Scotland.

== Biography ==
Born 1952 in Aachen (Germany) and brought up in the nearby town of Eschweiler, Heinz Giegerich studied English Linguistics, General Linguistics, English Literature and Journalism at the University of Mainz, graduating Magister Artium in 1978 under the supervision of Professors Klaus Faiss and Gerhard Wahrig. He joined the University of Edinburgh in 1979 as a lecturer and completed his PhD (Aspects of Metrical Phonology: German and English) there in 1983 under the supervision of John M Anderson. He was Associate Dean (Postgraduate) in the University's Faculty of Arts from 2000 to 2003 and Head of the Department of English Language from 2001 until its merger with Linguistics in 2005. He was the Director of the University's Angus McIntosh Centre for Historical Linguistics from 2012 to 2018 and retired from the University in 2019. He was a Trustee of the Scottish Language Dictionaries until 2024 and is an Honorary Member of the Angus McIntosh Centre and a Fellow of the Royal Society of Edinburgh. He lives in Innerleithen in the Scottish Borders.

His research and teaching focused on phonological and morphological theory, especially in relation to English and German. His particular research interests have included the following:

- the representation and explanatory capacity of prosodic structure (syllable structure, stress, rhythm) in phonological theory
- stress, poetic metre and more generally aspects of prosodic structure in the history of English
- the status of orthographic representations in phonological reasoning, and their integration in phonological theory
- the distinction between 'lexical' and 'post-lexical' phenomena, both in morphology and phonology
- the theory of 'base-driven lexical stratification', which he developed in the 1990s
- the interfaces of the morphology with the phonology and the syntax
- the study of morphological and syntactic phenomena which suggest that lexical levels, as well as the morphology and the syntax, are not discrete modules of the grammar but overlap with each other
- the analysis of compound words, within the theory of Lexicalism and more generally

Heinz Giegerich is the founder and, from 1996 to 2025, the General Editor of Edinburgh University Press's Edinburgh Textbooks on the English Language. Also with Edinburgh University Press, he was one of the founding Editors (with Laurie Bauer and Gregory Stump) of the linguistic morphology journal Word Structure, which first appeared in 2008, and co-edited the first ten volumes with them.

== Publications ==
His major publications include the following:

- Metrical phonology and phonological structure: German and English (= Cambridge Studies in Linguistics; 43). Cambridge: Cambridge University Press, 1985.
- English phonology: an introduction (Cambridge Textbooks in Linguistics). Cambridge: Cambridge University Press, 1992. [Korean translation, Yong ô um sông um un ron. Seoul: Han-shin Publishing Co., 1996.]
- Lexical strata in English: morphological causes, phonological effects (Cambridge Studies in Linguistics; 89). Cambridge: Cambridge University Press, 1999.
- Lexical structures: compounding and the modules of grammar (Edinburgh Studies in Theoretical Linguistics; 1). Edinburgh: Edinburgh University Press, 2015.
