= Morpheme =

Smallest meaningful unit in a language

In linguistics, a morpheme is the smallest meaningful constituent of a linguistic expression, especially within a word. Many words are themselves standalone morphemes, while other words contain multiple morphemes; in linguistic terminology, this is the distinction, respectively, between free and bound morphemes. The field of linguistic study dedicated to morphemes is called morphology.

In English, inside a word with multiple morphemes, the main morpheme that gives the word its basic meaning is called a root (such as cat inside the word cats), which can be bound or free. Meanwhile, additional bound morphemes, called affixes, may be added before or after the root, like the -s in cats, which indicates plurality but is always bound to a root noun and is not regarded as a word on its own. However, in some languages, including English and Latin, even many roots cannot stand alone; i.e., they are bound morphemes. For instance, the Latin root reg- ('king') must always be suffixed with a case marker: regis, regi, rex (reg+s), etc. The same is true of the English root nat(e) — ultimately inherited from a Latin root meaning "birth, born" — which appears in words like native, nation, nature, innate, and neonate.

These sample English words have the following morphological analyses:

- "Unbreakable" is composed of three morphemes: un- (a bound morpheme signifying negation), break (a verb that is the root of unbreakable: a free morpheme), and -able (a bound morpheme as an adjective suffix signifying "capable of, fit for, or worthy of").
- The plural morpheme for regular nouns (-s) has three allomorphs: it is pronounced /s/ (e.g., in cats /kæts/), /ɪz/ or /əz/ (e.g., in dishes /dɪʃɪz/), and /z/ (e.g., in dogs /dɒɡz/), depending on the pronunciation of the root.

== Classification ==
=== Free and bound morphemes ===
Every morpheme can be classified as free or bound:

- Free morphemes can function independently as words (e.g. town, dog) and can appear within lexemes (e.g. town hall, doghouse).
- Bound morphemes appear only as parts of words, always in conjunction with a root and sometimes with other bound morphemes. For example, un- appears only when accompanied by other morphemes to form a word. Most bound morphemes in English are affixes, specifically prefixes and suffixes. Examples of suffixes are -tion, -sion, -tive, -ation, -ible, and -ing. Bound morphemes that are not affixed are called cranberry morphemes.

=== Classification of bound morphemes ===
Bound morphemes can be further classified as derivational or inflectional morphemes. The main difference between them is their function in relation to words.

==== Derivational bound morphemes ====
- Derivational morphemes, when combined with a root, change the semantic meaning or the part of speech of the affected word. For example, in the word happiness, the addition of the bound morpheme -ness to the root happy changes the word from an adjective (happy) to a noun (happiness). In the word unkind, un- functions as a derivational morpheme since it inverts the meaning of the root morpheme (word) kind. Generally, morphemes that affix to a root morpheme (word) are bound morphemes.

==== Inflectional bound morphemes ====
- Inflectional morphemes modify the tense, aspect, mood, person, or number of a verb or the number, grammatical gender, or case of a noun, adjective, or pronoun without affecting the word's meaning or class (part of speech). Examples of applying inflectional morphemes to words are adding -s to the root cat to form cats and adding -ed to wait to form waited. An inflectional morpheme changes the form of a word. English has eight inflections.

=== Allomorphs ===
Allomorphs are variants of a morpheme that differ in form but are semantically similar. For example, the English plural marker has three allomorphs: /-z/ (bugs), /-s/ (bats), or /-ɪz, -əz/ (buses). An allomorph is a concrete realization of a morpheme, which is an abstract unit. That is parallel to the relation of an allophone and a phoneme.

=== Zero-morpheme ===
A zero-morpheme is a type of morpheme that carries semantic meaning, but is not realized in speech. A word with a zero-morpheme is analyzed as having the morpheme for grammatical purposes, but the morpheme is not realized in speech. They are often represented by /∅/ within glosses.

Generally, such morphemes have no visible changes. For instance, sheep is both the singular and the plural form of that noun; rather than taking the usual plural suffix -s to form hypothetical *sheeps, the plural is analyzed as being composed of sheep + -∅, the null plural suffix. The intended meaning is thus derived from the co-occurrence determiner (in this case, "some-" or "a-").

In some cases, a zero-morpheme may also be used to contrast with other inflected forms of a word that contain an audible morpheme. For example, the plural noun cats in English consists of the root cat and the plural suffix -s, and so the singular cat may be analyzed as the root inflected with the null singular suffix -∅.

=== Content vs. function ===
Content morphemes express a concrete meaning or content, and function morphemes have more of a grammatical role. For example, the morphemes fast and sad can be considered content morphemes. On the other hand, the suffix -ed is a function morpheme since it has the grammatical function of indicating past tense.

Both categories may seem very clear and intuitive, but the idea behind them is occasionally more difficult to grasp since they overlap with each other. Examples of ambiguous situations are the preposition over and the determiner your, which seem to have concrete meanings but are considered function morphemes since their role is to connect ideas grammatically. Here is a general rule to determine the category of a morpheme:

- Content morphemes include free morphemes that are nouns, adverbs, adjectives, or main verbs, as well as bound morphemes such as bound roots and derivational affixes.
- Function morphemes may be free morphemes that are prepositions, pronouns, determiners, auxiliary verbs or conjunctions, or bound morphemes that are inflectional affixes.

== Other features ==
Roots are composed of only one morpheme, but stems can be composed of more than one morpheme. Any additional affixes are considered morphemes. For example, in the word quirkiness, the root is quirk, but the stem is quirky, which has two morphemes.

Moreover, some pairs of affixes have identical phonological form but different meanings. For example, the suffix -er can be either derivational (e.g. sell ⇒ seller) or inflectional (e.g. small ⇒ smaller). Such morphemes are called homophonous.

Some words might seem to be composed of multiple morphemes but are not. Therefore, not only form but also meaning must be considered when identifying morphemes. For example, the word Madagascar is long and might seem to have morphemes like mad, gas, and car, but it does not. Conversely, some short words have multiple morphemes (e.g. dogs = dog + s).

== Morphological analysis ==
In natural language processing for Japanese, Chinese, and other languages, morphological analysis is the process of segmenting a sentence into a row of morphemes. Morphological analysis is closely related to part-of-speech tagging, but word segmentation is required for those languages because word boundaries are not indicated by blank spaces.

The purpose of morphological analysis is to determine the minimal units of meaning in a language (morphemes) by comparison of similar forms: such as comparing "She is walking" and "They are walking" with each other, rather than either with something less similar like "You are reading". Those forms can be effectively broken down into parts, and the different morphemes can be distinguished.

Both meaning and form are equally important for the identification of morphemes. An agent morpheme is an affix like -er that in English transforms a verb into an agent noun (e.g. teach → teacher). English also has another morpheme identical in pronunciation (and written form) but with unrelated meaning and function: a comparative morpheme that changes the positive form of an adjective to another degree of comparison (but remains the same adjective) (e.g. small → smaller). The opposite can also occur: a pair of morphemes with identical meaning but different forms.

== Changing definitions ==
In generative grammar, the definition of a morpheme depends heavily on whether syntactic trees have morphemes as leaves or features as leaves.

- Direct surface-to-syntax mapping in lexical functional grammar (LFG) – leaves are words
- Direct syntax-to-semantics mapping
  - Leaves in syntactic trees spell out morphemes: distributed morphology – leaves are morphemes
  - Branches in syntactic trees spell out morphemes: radical minimalism and nanosyntax – leaves are "nano-" (small) morpho-syntactic features

Given the definition of a morpheme as "the smallest meaningful unit", nanosyntax aims to account for idioms in which an entire syntactic tree often contributes "the smallest meaningful unit". An example idiom is "Don't let the cat out of the bag". There, the idiom is composed of "let the cat out of the bag". That might be considered a semantic morpheme, which is itself composed of many syntactic morphemes. Other cases of the "smallest meaningful unit" being longer than a word include some collocations such as "in view of" and "business intelligence" in which the words, when together, have a specific meaning.

The definition of morphemes also plays a significant role in the interfaces of generative grammar in the following theoretical constructs:

- Event semantics: the idea that each productive morpheme must have a compositional semantic meaning (a denotation), and if the meaning is there, there must be a morpheme (whether null or overt).
- Spell-out: the interface with which syntactic/semantic structures are "spelled out" by using words or morphemes with phonological content. That can also be thought of as lexical insertion into the syntactic.

== See also ==
- Alternation (linguistics) – Alternate phonetic realization of a morpheme
- Floating tone – Linguistic term
- Hybrid word – Word that etymologically derives from at least two languages
- List of Greek morphemes used in English
- Morphological parsing – Process of determining the morphemes from which a given word is constructed
- Morphophonology – Study of the interaction between morphology and phonology
- Morphotactics – Morpheme ordering restrictions
- Motif-Index of Folk-Literature – Six volume catalogue of folklore motifs used by folklorists, composed by Stith Thompson, featuring a comparable concept in folklore studies
- Theoretical linguistics – Branch of linguistics which inquires into the nature of language
- Word stem – Part of a word responsible for its lexical meaning
