= Productivity (linguistics) =

Current acceptance level of a word formation process

In linguistics, productivity is the degree to which speakers of a language use a particular grammatical process, especially in word formation. It compares grammatical processes that are in frequent use to less frequently used ones that tend towards lexicalization. Generally the test of productivity concerns identifying which grammatical forms would be used in the coining of new words: these will tend to only be converted to other forms using productive processes.

== Examples in English ==
In standard English, the formation of preterite and past participle forms of verbs by means of ablaut (as Germanic strong verbs, for example, sing–sang–sung) is no longer considered productive. Newly coined verbs in English overwhelmingly use the 'weak' (regular) ending -ed for the past tense and past participle (for example, spammed, e-mailed). Similarly, the only clearly productive plural ending is -(e)s; it is found on the vast majority of English count nouns and is used to form the plurals of neologisms, such as FAQs and apps. The ending -en, on the other hand, is no longer productive, being found only in oxen, children, and the now-rare brethren (as a plural of brother). Because these old forms can sound incorrect to modern ears, regularization can wear away at them until they are no longer used: brethren has now been replaced with the more regular-sounding brothers except when talking about religious orders. It appears that many strong verbs were completely lost during the transition from Old English to Middle English, possibly because they sounded archaic or were simply no longer truly understood.

In both cases, however, occasional exceptions have occurred. A false analogy with other verbs caused dug to become thought of as the "correct" preterite and past participle form of dig (the King James Bible preferred digged in 1611) and more recent examples, like snuck from sneak and dove from dive, have similarly become popular. Some American English dialects also use the non-standard drug as the past tense of drag.

== Significance ==
Since production of novel (new, non-established) structures is the clearest proof of usage of a grammatical process, the evidence most often appealed to as establishing productivity is the appearance of novel forms of the type the process leads one to expect, and many people would limit the definition offered above to exclude use of a grammatical process that does not result in a novel structure. Thus in practice, and, for many, in theory, productivity is the degree to which speakers use a particular grammatical process for the formation of novel structures. A productive grammatical process defines an open class, one which admits new words or forms. Non-productive grammatical processes may be seen as operative within closed classes: they remain within the language and may include very common words, but are not added to and may be lost in time or through regularization converting them into what now seems to be a correct form.

Productivity is, as stated above and implied in the examples already discussed, a matter of degree, and there are a number of areas in which that may be shown to be true. As the modern example of snuck from sneak shows, what has apparently been non-productive for many decades or even centuries may suddenly come to some degree of productive life, and it may do so in certain dialects or sociolects while not in others, or in certain parts of the vocabulary but not others. Some patterns are only very rarely productive, others may be used by a typical speaker several times a year or month, whereas others (especially syntactic processes) may be used productively dozens or hundreds of times in a typical day. It is not atypical for more than one pattern with similar functions to be comparably productive, to the point that a speaker can be in a quandary as to which form to use —e.g., would it be better to say that a taste or color like that of raisins is raisinish, raisiny, raisinlike, or even raisinly?

It can also be very difficult to assess when a given usage is productive or when a person is using a form that has already been learned as a whole. Suppose a reader comes across an unknown word such as despisement meaning "an attitude of despising". The reader may apply the verb+ment noun-formational process to understand the word perfectly well, and this would be a kind of productive use. This would be essentially independent of whether or not the writer had also used the same process productively in coining the term, or whether he or she had learned the form from previous usage (as most English speakers have learned government, for instance), and no longer needed to apply the process productively in order to use the word. Similarly a speaker or writer's use of words like raisinish or raisiny may or may not involve productive application of the noun+ish and noun+y rules, and the same is true of a hearer or reader's understanding of them. But it will not necessarily be at all clear to an outside observer, or even to the speaker and hearer themselves, whether the form was already learnt and whether the rules were applied or not.

== Examples in other languages ==
One study, which focuses on the usage of the Dutch suffix -heid (comparable to -ness in English) hypothesizes that -heid gives rise to two kinds of abstract nouns: those referring to concepts and those referring to states of affairs. It shows that the referential function of -heid is typical for the lowest-frequency words, while its conceptual function is typical for the highest-frequency words. It claims that high-frequency formations with the suffix -heid are available in the mental lexicon, whereas low-frequency words and neologisms are produced and understood by rule.

== See also ==
- Word formation
- Inflection
