= Word formation =

Creation of new lexemes or the process of changing words

In linguistics, word formation is an ambiguous term that can refer to either:

- the processes through which words can change (i.e. morphology), or
- the creation of new lexemes in a particular language

== Morphological ==
A common method of word formation is the attachment of inflectional or derivational affixes.

=== Derivation ===
Examples include:

- the words governor, government, governable, misgovern, ex-governor, and ungovernable are all derived from the base word (to) govern

=== Inflection ===
Inflection is modifying a word for the purpose of fitting it into the grammatical structure of a sentence. For example:

- manages and managed are inflected from the base word (to) manage
- worked is inflected from the verb (to) work
- talks, talked, and talking are inflected from the base (to) talk

== Nonmorphological ==
=== Abbreviation ===
Examples includes:

- etc. from et cetera

=== Acronyms & Initialisms ===
An acronym is a word formed from the first letters of other words. For example:

- NASA is the acronym for National Aeronautics and Space Administration
- IJAL (pronounced /ˈaɪˌdʒæl/) is the acronym for International Journal of American Linguistics

Acronyms are usually written entirely in capital letters, though some words originating as acronyms, like radar, are now treated as common nouns.

Initialisms are similar to acronyms, but where the letters are pronounced as a series of letters. For example:

- ATM for Automated Teller Machine
- SIA for Singapore International Airlines

=== Back-formation ===
In linguistics, back-formation is the process of forming a new word by removing actual affixes, or parts of the word that is re-analyzed as an affix, from other words to create a base. Examples include:

- the verb headhunt is a back-formation of headhunter
- the verb edit is formed from the noun editor
- the word televise is a back-formation of television

The process is motivated by analogy: edit is to editor as act is to actor. This process leads to a lot of denominal verbs.

The productivity of back-formation is limited, with the most productive forms of back-formation being hypocoristics.

=== Blending ===
A lexical blend is a complex word typically made of two word fragments. For example:

- smog is a blend of smoke and fog
- brunch is a blend of breakfast and lunch.
- stagflation is a blend of stagnation and inflation
- chunnel is a blend of channel and tunnel, referring to the Channel Tunnel

Although blending is listed under the Nonmorphological heading, there are debates as to how far blending is a matter of morphology.

=== Compounding ===
Compounding is the processing of combining two bases, where each base may be a fully-fledged word. For example:

- desktop is formed by combining desk and top
- railway is formed by combining rail and way
- firefighter is formed by combining fire and fighter

Compounding is a topic relevant to syntax, semantics, and morphology.

== Hashtagging as word formation ==
Linguists argue that hashtags are words and hashtagging is a morphological process. Social media users view the syntax of existing viral hashtags as guiding principles for creating new ones. A hashtag's popularity is therefore influenced more by the presence of popular hashtags with similar syntactic patterns than by its conciseness and clarity.

== Word formation vs. semantic change ==
There are processes for forming new dictionary items which are not considered under the umbrella of word formation. One specific example is semantic change, which is a change in a single word's meaning. The boundary between word formation and semantic change can be difficult to define as a new use of an old word can be seen as a new word derived from an old one and identical to it in form.

== See also ==
- Neologism
