= Udmurt grammar =

Grammar of the Udmurt language

This article deals with the grammar of the Udmurt language.

== Pronouns ==
Udmurt pronouns are inflected much in the same way that their referent nouns are. However, personal pronouns are only inflected in the grammatical cases and cannot be inflected in the locative cases.

=== Personal pronouns ===
Somewhat like in English, Udmurt personal pronouns are used to refer to human beings only. However, the third person singular can be referred to it. Udmurt personal pronouns only inflect in the grammatical cases and the allative case. The nominative case of personal pronouns are listed in the following table:

Personal pronouns
	Singular	Plural
1st person	мон /mon/ I	ми /mi/ we
2nd person	тон /ton/ you	тӥ /ti/ you
3rd person	со /so/ she or he or it	соос /soːs/ they

=== Reflexive pronouns ===
Udmurt reflexive pronouns only inflect in the grammatical cases and the allative case. The nominative case of reflexive pronouns are listed in the following table:

Reflexive pronouns
	Singular	Plural
1st person	аслам /ɑsɫɑm/ me myself	асьмеос /ɑɕmeos/ we ourselves
2nd person	аслад /ɑsɫɑd/ you yourself	асьтэос /ɑɕteos/ you yourselves
3rd person	аслаз /ɑsɫɑz/ she herself/he himself/it itself	асьсэос /ɑɕseos/ they themselves

=== Interrogative pronouns ===
Udmurt interrogative pronouns inflect in all cases. However, the inanimate interrogative pronouns 'what' in the locative cases have the base form кыт-. The nominative case of interrogative pronouns are listed in the following table:

Interrogative pronouns (nominative case)
	Singular	Plural
what	ма /mɑ/	маос /mɑos/
who	кин /kin/	кинъëс /kinjos/

The following table shows Udmurt interrogative pronouns in all the cases :

Interrogative pronouns (all cases)
Case	кин- /kin/	English	ма-/кыт- /mɑ/kɨt/	English
Nominative	кин /kin/	who	ма /mɑ/	what
Accusative	кинэ /kine/	whom	мае /mɑje/	what
Genitive	кинлэн /kinɫen/	whose	малэн /mɑɫen/	of what
Ablative	кинлэсь /kinɫeɕ/	from whom	малэсь /mɑɫeɕ/	from what
Dative	кинлы /kinɫɨ/	to whom	малы /mɑɫɨ/	to what
Instructive	кинэн /kinen/	with whom	маин /mɑin/	with what
Abessive	кинтэк /kintek/	without whom	матэк /mɑtek/	without what
Adverbial	кинъя /kinjɑ	in whose way	мая /mɑjɑ	in what way
Inessive	–	–	кытын /kɨtɨn/	where
Illative	–	–	кытчы /kɨt͡ːʃɨ/	to where
Elative	–	–	кытысь /kɨtɨɕ/	from where
Egressive	–	–	кытысен /kɨtɨɕen/	start from where
Terminative	–	–	кытчыозь /kɨt͡ːʃɨoʑ/	end up where
Prolative	–	–	кытӥ /kɨti/	along where
Allative*	кинлань /kinɫɑɲ/	towards whom	малань /mɑɫɑɲ/	towards where

*The allative case is commonly called "approximative" when talking about Udmurt and Komi.

== Noun forms ==
Udmurt does not distinguish gender in nouns or even in personal pronouns: 'со' = 'he' or 'she' depending on the referent.

=== Cases ===
Udmurt has fifteen noun cases: eight grammatical cases and seven locative cases. Notice that the word in a given locative case modifies the verb, not a noun. The locative cases can only be used with inanimate references with the exception of the allative case. Alternative forms containing -ы- can only be used after the plural suffix (i.e. the illative singular гуртэ, but plural гуртъёсы). The less common accusative suffix -ты is used after the plural suffix, in addition to more common -ыз.

Udmurt cases
Case	Suffix	English prep.	Example	Translation
Grammatical
nominative	–	–	гурт /gurt/	village
genitive	-лэн /ɫen/	of / 's	гуртлэн /gurtɫen/	of a village / village's
accusative	-эз/-ез/-ты/-ыз /ez/jez/tɨ/ɨz/	–	гуртэз /gurtez/	village (as an object)
ablative	-лэсь /ɫeɕ/	from	гуртлэсь /gurtɫeɕ/	from a village
dative	-лы /ɫɨ/	to/for	гуртлы /gurtɫɨ/	to a village
instrumental	-эн/-ен/-ын /en/jen/ɨn/	with/by means of	гуртэн /gurten/	by means of a village
abessive	-тэк /tek/	without	гурттэк /gurtːek/	without a village
adverbial	-я /jɑ/	in a way	гуртъя /gurtjɑ/	in a village way
Locative cases
inessive	-ын /ɨn/	in	гуртын /gurtɨn/	in a village
illative	-э/-е/-ы /e/je/ɨ/	into	гуртэ /gurte/	into a village (or house)
elative	-ысь /ɨɕ/	from	гуртысь /gurtɨɕ/	from a village
egressive	-ысен /ɨɕen/	starting from	гуртысен /gurtɨɕen/	starting from a village
terminative	-озь /oʑ/	end up	гуртозь /gurtoʑ/	end up at a village
prolative	-этӥ/-етӥ/-ытӥ/-тӥ /eti/jeti/ɨti/ti/	along	гуртэтӥ /gurteti/	along a village
allative*	-лань /ɫɑɲ/	towards	гуртлань /gurtɫɑɲ/	towards a village

*The allative case is commonly called "approximative" when talking about Udmurt and Komi.

Udmurt case endings affix directly to nouns quite regularly with the exception of a few lexemes of Uralic origin. These lexemes have stem changes when declining in the locative cases whose endings begin with a vowel:

Examples of lexemes with varied stems
Lexeme	Stem	Inessive	English	Original stem form	Cognate example
син /ɕin/	синм- /ɕinm/	синмын /ɕinmɨn/	(in an) eye	*-lm- → *-nm-	Finnish: silmä 'eye'
ин /in/	инм- /inm/	инмын /inmɨn/	(in the) sky	*-lm- → *-nm-	Finnish: ilma 'air'
кус /kus/	куск- /kusk/	кускын /kuskɨn/	(in the) hips	*-sk-	Erzya: каске 'rump'
нюлэс /ɲuɫes/	нюлэск- /ɲuɫesk/	нюлэскын /ɲuɫeskɨn/	(in the) forest	*-sk-	
мыш /mɨʃ/	мышк- /mɨʃk/	мышкын /mɨʃkɨn/	(in the) spine	*-šk-	Ingrian: muhku 'bump, swelling'
кык /kɨk/	кыкт- /kɨkt/	кыктэтӥ /kɨkteti/	two; second	*-kt-	Northern Sami: guokte 'two'

The personal pronouns, however, have irregularities in comparison to the declension of other nouns:

Udmurt personal pronoun declensions
Case	1st pers. sing.	2nd pers. sing.	3rd pers. sing.	1st pers. pl	2nd pers. pl.	3rd pers pl.
nominative	мон /mon/	тон /ton/	со /so/	ми /mi/	тӥ /ti/	соос /soːs/
genitive	мынам /mɨnɑm/	тынад /tɨnɑd/	солэн /soɫen/	милям /miʎɑm/	тӥляд /tiʎɑd/	соослэн /soːsɫen/
accusative	монэ /mone/	тонэ /tone/	сое /soje/	милемыз ~ милемды /miʎemɨz/ ~ /miʎemdɨ/	тӥледыз ~ тӥледды /tiʎedɨz/ ~ /tiʎeddɨ/	соосыз ~ соосты /soːsɨz/ ~ /soːstɨ/
ablative	мынэсьтым /mɨneɕtɨm/	тынэсьтыд /tɨneɕtɨd/	солэсь /soɫeɕ/	милесьтым /miʎeɕtɨm/	тӥлесьтыд /tiʎeɕtɨd/	соослэсь /soːsɫeɕ/
dative	мыным /mɨnɨm/	тыныд /tɨnɨd/	солы /soɫɨ/	милем(лы) /miʎem(ɫɨ)/	тӥлед(лы) /tiʎed(ɫɨ)/	соослы /soːsɫɨ/
instrumental	монэн ~ монэным /monen/ ~ /monenɨm/	тонэн ~ тонэныд /tonen/ ~ /tonenɨd/	соин /soin/	милемын ~ миленымы /miʎemɨn/ ~ /miʎenɨmɨ/	тӥледын ~ тӥленыды /tiʎedɨn/ ~ /tiʎenɨdɨ/	соосын /soːsɨn/
abessive	монтэк /montek/	тонтэк /tontek/	сотэк /sotek/	митэк /mitek/	тӥтэк /titek/	соостэк /soːstek/
adverbial	монъя /monjɑ/	тонъя /tonjɑ/	соя /sojɑ/	мия /mijɑ/	тӥя /tijɑ/	соосъя /soːsjɑ/
allative	монлань /monɫɑɲ/	тонлань /tonlɑɲ/	солань /soɫɑɲ/	милань /miɫɑɲ/	тӥлань /tiɫɑɲ/	соослань /soːsɫɑɲ/

=== Plural ===
There are two types of nominal plurals in Udmurt. One is the plural for nouns -ос (after vowels)/-ëс (after consonants)/-ъёс (after certain consonants to avoid palatalization) and the other is the plural for adjectives -эсь/-есь.

==== Nominal plural ====
The noun is always in plural. In attributive plural phrases, the adjective is not required to be in the plural:

Attributive plural
Udmurt	English
чебер(есь) нылъëс	(the) beautiful girls

The plural marker always comes before other endings (i.e. cases and possessive suffixes) in the morphological structure of plural nominal.

Morphological order
Udmurt	English
нылъëслы	to the girls
гуртъëсазы	to/in their villages

==== Predicative plural ====
As in Hungarian, if the subject is plural, the adjective is always plural when it functions as the sentence's predicative:

Attributive plural
Udmurt	English
нылъëс чебересь	the girls are beautiful
толъёс кузесь	the winters are cold

==== Following numerals ====
Nouns are ordinarily in the singular when following cardinal numbers. However, a living being as the sentence's subject may be in the plural. In this case, the predicate verb must be in congruency with the subject.

Udmurt	English
Та гуртын витьтон куать корка	There are fifty-six houses in this village
Аудиториын дас студент пуке ~ Аудиториын дас студентъëс пуко	There are ten students sitting in the lecture hall

=== Possessive suffixes ===
==== Nominal possessive suffixes ====
Udmurt possessive suffixes are added to the end of nouns either before or after a case ending. The possessive suffixes vary in the nominative and accusative cases and with case endings. The consonant of the second and third person plural depends on if the last phoneme of the word is voiced or unvoiced.

Nominative possessive suffix
Suffix ending	Udmurt	English
-е/-э	эше	my friend
-ед/-эд	эшед	your friend
-ез/-эз	эшез	his/her friend
-мы	эшмы	our friend
-ды/-ты	эшты	your (pl) friend
-зы/-сы	эшсы	their friend

Certain lexemes of Finno-Ugric origin (especially those ending with a vowel or meaning an inalienable object) contain the vowel -ы- in the first, second and third person singular nominative possessive suffixes:

Nominative possessive suffix
Suffix ending	Udmurt	Finnish equivalent	English
-ы	киы	käteni	my hand
-ыд	киыд	kätesi	your hand
-ыз	киыз	kätensä	his/her hand

==== Accusative possessive suffixes ====
Accusative possessive suffixes are shown in the following table. The consonant of the second and third person singular and plural depends on if the last phoneme of the word is voiced or unvoiced.

Accusative possessive suffix
Suffix ending	Udmurt	English
-ме	эшме	my friend
-тэ/-дэ	эштэ	your friend
-сэ/-зэ	эшсэ	his/her friend
-мес	эшмес	our friend
-дэс/-тэс	эштэс	your (pl) friend
-зэс/-сэс	эшсэс	their friend

==== Possessive suffixes with case endings, singular ====
The morphological placement of possessive suffixes with other endings depends on the case. Possessive suffixes are the same as nominative suffixes after which the genitive, ablative, dative, abessive, adverbial and allative cases agglutinates.

Possessive suffixes with case endings
Case	Udmurt (first person singular)	English
nominative	гуртэ	my village
genitive	гуртэлэн	my village's/of my village
ablative	гуртэлэсь	from my village
dative	гуртэлы	for my village
abessive	гуртэтэк	without my village
adverbial	гуртэя	across my village
allative	гуртэлань	towards my village

The possessive suffix follows the instrumental, inessive, illative, elative egressive, terminative and prolative cases and the vowel reduces to ы in the singular persons. An м, an old Uralic first person singular marker, appears in the first person singular. When adding a possessive suffix, the inessive and illative forms change to -а- and the elative form changes to -ысьт-. The ы does not appear in the inessive, illative, terminative and prolative cases where the case ends with a vowel.

Possessive suffixes with case endings
person	instrumental	inessive	illative	elative	egressive	terminative	prolative
Singular
first	гуртэным	гуртам	гуртам	гуртысьтым	гуртысеным	гуртозям	гуртэтӥм
second	гуртэныд	гуртад	гуртад	гуртысьтыд	гуртысеныд	гуртозяд	гуртэтӥд
third	гуртэныз	гуртаз	гуртаз	гуртысьтыз	гуртысеныз	гуртозяз	гуртэтӥз
Plural
first	гуртэнымы	гуртамы	гуртамы	гуртысьтымы	гуртысенымы	гуртозямы	гуртэтӥмы
second	гуртэныды	гуртады	гуртады	гуртысьтыды	гуртысеныды	гуртозяды	гуртэтӥды
third	гуртэнызы	гуртазы	гуртазы	гуртысьтызы	гуртысенызы	гуртозязы	гуртэтӥзы

==== Possessive suffixes with case endings, plural ====
As in the singular, possessive suffixes precede the genitive, ablative, dative, abessive, adverbial and allative cases. However, the vowel of the singular persons reduce to ы:

Possessive suffixes with case endings
Case	Udmurt (first person singular)	English
nominative	гуртъëсы	my villages
genitive	гуртъëсылэн	my villages'/of my villages
ablative	гуртъëсылэсь	from my villages
dative	гуртъëсылы	for my villages
abessive	гуртъëсытэк	without my villages
adverbial	гуртъëсыя	across my villages
allative	гуртъëсылань	towards my villages

As in the singular, possessive suffixes follow the instrumental, inessive, illative, elative, egressive, terminative and prolative cases. The suffix forms follow the same structure as in the singular. The same exceptions appear in the plural as in the singular with the added exception of the instrumental э/е reducing to ы and the prolative э/е not used.

Possessive suffixes with case endings
Case	Udmurt (first person singular)	English
instrumental	гуртъëсыным	by means of my villages
inessive	гуртъëсам	in my villages
illative	гуртъëсам	to my villages
elative	гуртъëсысьтым	from my villages
egressive	гуртъëсысеным	starting from my villages
terminative	гуртъëсозям	ending up at my villages
prolative	гуртъëстӥм	along my villages

Some words can be used as nouns, adjectives, and adverbs without a change in form. For example, чылкыт /t͡ʃɨɫkɨt/ means "cleanliness", "clean", and "clearly".

The third person singular possessive suffix may also act as a definite article: удмурт кыл(ыз) чебер /udmurt kɨɫ(ɨz) t͡ʃeber/ ("the Udmurt language is nice" – literally "Udmurt language's nice"). This feature is similar to that of Indonesian.

== Adjectives ==
There is no congruency between adjectives and nouns in neutral Udmurt noun phrases, i.e. there is no adjective declension as in the inessive noun phrase бадӟым гуртын, 'in a large/big village' (cf. Finnish inessive phrase isossa kylässä 'in a large/big village', in which iso 'big/large' is inflected according to the head noun). However, as stated earlier, Udmurt adjectives in neutral attributive (non-predicative) noun phrases may have a plural marker when the noun is pluralised.

=== Determinative ===
Udmurt does have an emphasising determinative suffix. Its function is to place emphasis on the features of the referent, defining and separating it from a group of other similar referents. The third person singular possessive suffix -ез/-эз and -из and plural -ыз acts as the determinative suffix. The determinative adjective conjugates as in the third person singular or plural and the noun conjugates without any other marker.

Determinative suffix
Case	neutral	English	determinative	English
Singular
nominative	бадӟым гурт	(a) big village	бадӟымез гурт	(specifically) a big village
inessive	бадӟым гуртын	in a big village	бадӟымаз гуртын	in the (specifically) big village
illative	бадӟым гуртэ	to a big village	бадӟымаз гуртэ	to the (specifically) big village
elative	бадӟым гуртысь	from a big village	бадӟымысьтыз гуртысь	from the (specifically) big village
Plural
nominative	бадӟым(есь) гуртъëс	(the) big villages	бадӟымъëсыз гуртъëс	the (specifically) big villages
inessive	бадӟым(есь) гуртъëсын	in the big villages	бадӟымъëсаз гуртъëсын	in the (specifically) big villages
illative	бадӟым(есь) гуртъëсы	to the big villages	бадӟымъëсаз гуртъëсы	to the (specifically) big villages
elative	бадӟым(есь) гуртъëсысь	from a big village	адӟымъëсысьтыз гуртъëсысьб	from the (specifically) big village

=== Comparative ===
Comparative is used when two referents are compared to each other but the subject of comparison does not necessarily need to be expressed.

The comparative suffix in Udmurt is -гес. The subject of comparison can be expressed either in the ablative case or with the postposition сярысь structure. If the subject of comparison it is shown the comparative suffix can be left out.

Comparative
Udmurt	English
Скал ыжлэсь бадӟым(гес) ~ Скал ыж сярысь бадӟым(гес)	A cow is larger than a sheep

=== Superlative ===
There is no superlative suffix in Udmurt. Superlative is expressed with the Russian particle самой or indefinitive expressions ваньмызлэсь, котькинлэсь or котьмалэсь.

Superlative
Udmurt	English
самой ~ ваньмызлэсь ~ котькинлэсь ~ котьмалэсь бадӟым	biggest (of them all)
самой ~ ваньмызлэсь ~ котькинлэсь ~ котьмалэсь выль	newest (of them all)
самой ~ ваньмызлэсь ~ котькинлэсь ~ котьмалэсь дун	cleanest (of them all)

== Postpositions ==
Udmurt makes use of postpositions rather than prepositions. A large percentage of the stems of Udmurt postpositions have a locative meaning and can conjugate in the local cases. For example, выл means 'top' and also 'surface' and can inflect in all the locative cases: (inessive) вылын, (elative) вылысь, (illative) вылэ, (prolative) вылтӥ, (egressive) вылысен, (terminative) вылозь and (allative) выллань.

However less than the seven locative cases are included in paradigm inflection of many of the postpositions. The paradigm usually consists of the inessive, elative and illative cases. Like nominals of foreign Uralic origin, some postpositions have a consonant in their stem. such as вис(к-), 'between'.

Some common postpositions are:

Postpositions
Stem	Example (inessive)	English
азь	азьын	in front of
выл	вылын	on top of
дор	дорын	next to, at
бӧрсьы	бӧрсьыын	in back of/behind
пум	пумын	at the end of
ул	улын	under

The illative case can vary between -э/-е and -ы. The illative form of the postposition пал 'side' is пала 'to the side of'.

Postpositions
Stem	Example (illative)	English
-э/-е
азь	азе	to the front of
выл	вылэ	to the top of
пум	пуме	to the end of
ул	улыэ	under
-ы
дор	доры	next to, at
шор	шоры	to the centre of
сьӧр	сьӧры	to the behind of
вис(к-)	вискы	between

There is also a small group of non-inflecting postpositions in addition to those inflecting in the locative cases (cf. Finnish kanssa "with (a person)" that always takes the genitive case: ystävän kanssa "with a friend"). A few examples of these are:

Postposition	English
артэ	next to
бере	after
быдэ	all, each
валче	together; because of, due to
дыръя	during
кузя	along
сямен	in the way of/ -wise
сярысь	about
ӵоже	within
ӵош	together

Most of the nouns in Udmurt postposition phrases are inflected in the nominative but there are a few postpositions that require the noun to be in the dative, ablative or instrumental cases:

Example	English
Nominative
ӝок вылын	on top of a/the table
писпу сьӧрысь	from behind a/the tree
анай сярысь	about (a) mother
университет бере	after university
тон понна	because of you
Dative
арлы быдэ	every year
тӧллы пумит	against the wind
Ablative
талэсь азьло	before this
Instrumental
анаен ӵош	with mother
соин валче	because of it
монэн артэ	next to me

== Verbs ==
Udmurt verbs are divided into two groups or two conjugations, both having the infinitive marker -ны. The conjugation I type verb is structured with ы as in мыныны, 'to go'. The conjugation II type verb features an -а- in the infinitive as in ужаны, 'to work'. The conjugation I verb can also have two stems, a full stem as in мыны- and a short stem as in мын-.

There are three verbal moods in Udmurt: indicative, conditional and imperative. There is also an optative mood used in certain dialects. The indicative mood has four tenses: present, future, and two past tenses. In addition there are four past tense structures which include auxiliary verbs. Verbs are negated by use of an auxiliary negative verb that conjugates with personal endings. Separate personal pronouns are not required in verb phrases.

The basic verbal personal markers in Udmurt are (with some exceptions):

Personal endings of verbs
Person	Ending
Singular
1st	-Ø
2nd	-д
3rd	-з
Plural
1st	-мы
2nd	-ды
3rd	-зы

=== Present tense ===
Present tense in Udmurt, in all but the third person, is marked with -(ӥ)сько-/-(и)сько-. Third person singular is marked with -э/-е (conjugation I) or unmarked (conjugation II) and third person plural is marked with -о (conjugation I) or -ло (conjugation II).

Present tense
Person	тодыны (conjugation I)	English	кырӟаны (conjugation II)	English
Singular
1st	тодӥсько	I know	кырӟасько	I sing/I am singing
2nd	тодӥськод	you know	кырӟаськод	you sing/you are singing
3rd	тодэ	he/she knows	кырӟа	he/she sings / he/she is singing
Plural
1st	тодӥськомы	we know	кырӟаськомы	we sing/we are singing
2nd	тодӥськоды	you know	кырӟаськоды	you sing/you are singing
3rd	тодо	they know	кырӟало	they sing/they are singing

The negative indicative present is formed by the auxiliary у- negative verb and the marker -(ӥ)ськы/-(и)ськы in the first and second person singular or -(ӥ)ське/-(и)ське in the first and second plural of the main verb. The third person singular main verb is either marked by the full stem (conjugation I) or unmarked (conjugation II). The third person plural is marked with -о (conjugation I) or -ло (conjugation II).

The negative verb conjugates with the ending -г in first and third person singular and third person plural. Second person singular and plural both conjugate with the ending -д and first person plural with -м.

Present tense negative
Person	тодыны (conjugation I)	English	кырӟаны (conjugation II)	English
Singular
1st	уг тодӥськы	I do not know	уг кырӟаськы	I do not sing/I am not singing
2nd	уд тодӥськы	you do not know	уд кырӟаськы	you do not sing/you are not singing
3rd	уг тоды	he/she does not know	уг кырӟа	he/she does not sing / he/she is not singing
Plural
1st	ум тодӥське	we do not know	ум кырӟаське	we do not sing/we are not singing
2nd	уд тодӥське	you do notknow	уд кырӟаське	you do not sing/you are not singing
3rd	уг тодо	they do not know	уг кырӟало	they do not sing/they are not singing

=== Future tense ===
The future tense in Udmurt is marked with -о- in conjugation I verbs and -ло- in conjugation II verbs.

Future tense
Person	тодыны (conjugation I)	English	кырӟаны (conjugation II)	English
Singular
1st	тодо	I will know	кырӟало	I will sing/I will be singing
2nd	тодод	you will know	кырӟалод	you will sing/you will be singing
3rd	тодоз	he/she will know	кырӟалоз	he/she will sing / he/she will be singing
Plural
1st	тодомы	we will know	кырӟаломы	we will sing/we will be singing
2nd	тододы	you will know	кырӟалоды	you will sing/you will be singing
3rd	тодозы	they will know	кырӟалозы	they will sing/they will be singing

The negative indicative future is formed by the auxiliary у- negative verb and the stem of the main verb in singular persons. The plural persons are marked either with -э/-е (conjugation I) or -лэ (conjugation II)

The negative verb conjugates with the ending -г in first person singular. Third person singular and third person plural have the ending -з and the remaining are as in present negative.

Future tense negative
Person	тодыны (conjugation I)	English	кырӟаны (conjugation II)	English
Singular
1st	уг тод(ы)	I will not know	уг кырӟа	I will not sing/I will not be singing
2nd	уд тод(ы)	you will not know	уд кырӟа	you will not sing/you will not be singing
3rd	уз тод(ы)	he/she will not know	уз кырӟа	he/she will not sing / he/she will not be singing
Plural
1st	ум тодэ	we will not know	ум кырӟалэ	we will not sing/we will not be singing
2nd	уд тодэ	you will not know	уд кырӟалэ	you will not sing/you will not be singing
3rd	уз тодэ	they will not know	уз кырӟалэ	they will not sing/they will not be singing

=== Past tense ===
The conventionally used designations preterite and perfect are used with denotations which are divergent from their usual meanings in the grammar of other languages.

==== Preterite I ====
The first preterite can be compared with the simple past in English. Preterite I is marked with ӥ/и in conjugation I. There is no past tense marker in conjugation II verbs with the exception of й in the first person singular.

Preterite I
Person	тодыны (conjugation I)	English	кырӟаны (conjugation II)	English
Singular
1st	тодӥ	I knew	кырӟай	I sang
2nd	тодӥд	you knew	кырӟад	you sang
3rd	тодӥз	he/she knew	кырӟаз	he/she sang
Plural
1st	тодӥм(ы)	we knew	кырӟам(ы)	we sang
2nd	тодӥды	you knew	кырӟады	you sang
3rd	тодӥзы	they knew	кырӟазы	they sang

The negative preterite I is formed by the auxiliary ӧ- negative verb and the stem of the main verb in singular persons. The plural persons are marked either with -э/-е (conjugation I) or -лэ (conjugation II)

The negative verb conjugates with the ending -й in first person singular. Third person singular and third person plural have the ending -з and the remaining are as in present negative.

Preterite I negative
Person	тодыны (conjugation I)	English	кырӟаны (conjugation II)	English
Singular
1st	ӧй тоды	I did not know	ӧй кырӟа	I did not sing
2nd	ӧд тоды	you did not know	ӧд кырӟа	you did not sing
3rd	ӧз тоды	he/she did not know	ӧз кырӟа	he/she did not sing
Plural
1st	ӧм тодэ	we did not know	ӧм кырӟалэ	we did not sing
2nd	ӧд тодэ	you did not know	ӧд кырӟалэ	you did not sing
3rd	ӧз тодэ	they did not know	ӧз кырӟалэ	they did not sing

==== Preterite II ====
The second preterite is a past tense with an evidentiality distinction. It can be compared to the English perfect in which the speaker did not personally observe the past event. The preterite II is marked with (э)м/(е)м, which is historically related to the third infinitive in Finnish.

In addition to the normal personal endings, the present indicative marker -(ӥ)ськ-/-(и)ськ- is featured in first persons and a frequentive verbal marker -лля- is present in the second and third person plural. There is no personal ending in the third person singular and sometimes featured in the third person plural.

Preterite II
Person	тодыны (conjugation I)	English	кырӟаны (conjugation II)	English
Singular
1st	тодӥськем	I have evidently known	кырӟаськем	I have evidently sung
2nd	тодэмед	you have evidently known	кырӟамед	you have evidently sung
3rd	тодэм	he/she has evidently known	кырӟам	he/she has evidently sung
Plural
1st	тодӥськеммы	we have evidently known	кырӟаськемм(ы)	we have evidently sung
2nd	тодӥллямды	you have evidently known	кырӟаллямды	you have evidently sung
3rd	тодӥллям(зы)	they have evidently known	кырӟаллям(зы)	they evidently sung

The negative preterite II is formed either by including the auxiliary copular negative verb ӧвӧл 'is not' or with the negation marker -мтэ-.

Preterite II negative
Person	тодыны (conjugation I)	English	кырӟаны (conjugation II)	English
Singular
1st	тодӥськымтэе ~ ӧвӧл тодӥськем	I have evidently not known	кырӟаськымтэе ~ ӧвӧл кырӟаськем	I have evidently not sung
2nd	тодымтэед ~ ӧвӧл тодэмед	you have evidently not known	кырӟамтэед ~ ӧвӧл кырӟамед	you have evidently not sung
3rd	тодымтэ ~ ӧвӧл тодэм	he/she has evidently not known	кырӟамтэ ~ ӧвӧл кырӟам	he/she has evidently not sung
Plural
1st	тодӥськымтэмы ~ ӧвӧл тодӥськеммы	we have evidently not known	кырӟаськымтэмы ~ ӧвӧл кырӟаськемм(ы)	we have evidently not sung
2nd	тодӥллямтэды ~ ӧвӧл тодӥллямды	you have evidently not known	кырӟаллямтэды ~ ӧвӧл кырӟаллямды	you have evidently not sung
3rd	тодӥллямтэ ~ ӧвӧл тодӥллям(зы)	they have evidently not known	кырӟаллямтэ ~ ӧвӧл кырӟаллям(зы)	they have evidently not sung

==== Auxiliary past tenses ====
There are four past tenses in Udmurt which use a preterite form of the main verb and a preterite form of the auxiliary verb 'to be'.

===== Pluperfect I =====
The Udmurt pluperfect makes use of the preterite I main verb and the auxiliary вал, 'was' in third person singular, also in simple past. The pluperfect I tense expresses a process of action that has happened in the (distant) past.

Pluperfect I
Person	тодыны (conjugation I)	English	кырӟаны (conjugation II)	English
Singular
1st	тодӥ вал	I had known	кырӟай вал	I had sung
2nd	тодӥд вал	you had known	кырӟад вал	you had sung
3rd	тодӥз вал	he/she had known	кырӟаз вал	he/she had sung
Plural
1st	тодӥм(ы) вал	we had known	кырӟам(ы) вал	we had sung
2nd	тодӥды вал	you had known	кырӟады вал	you had sung
3rd	тодӥзы вал	they had known	кырӟазы вал	they had sung

The negative Pluperfect I is formed by the negative preterite I negative plus the auxiliary вал.

Pluperfect I negative
Person	тодыны (conjugation I)	English	кырӟаны (conjugation II)	English
Singular
1st	ӧй тоды вал	I had not known	ӧй кырӟа вал	I had not sung
2nd	ӧд тоды вал	you had not known	ӧд кырӟа вал	you had not sung
3rd	ӧз тоды вал	he/she had not known	ӧз кырӟа вал	he/she had not sung
Plural
1st	ӧм тодэ вал	we had not known	ӧм кырӟалэ вал	we had not sung
2nd	ӧд тодэ вал	you had not known	ӧд кырӟалэ вал	you had not sung
3rd	ӧз тодэ вал	they had not known	ӧз кырӟалэ вал	they had not sung

===== Pluperfect II =====
There are two structures of the pluperfect II tense. One uses the preterite II third person singular form of the main verb inflected with a personal possessive suffix and the auxiliary вал. The other is the preterite II of the main verb (with normal personal inflection) and the preterite I form of the 'to' be verb вылэм. The pluperfect II tense expresses the result of an action that has been completed, but no one had seen.

Pluperfect II (тодыны)
Person	Pluperfect II a	Pluperfect II b	English
Singular
1st	тодэме вал	тодӥськем вылэм	I had evidently known
2nd	тодэмед вал	тодэмед вылэм	you had evidently known
3rd	тодэм вал	тодэм вылэм	he/she had evidently known
Plural
1st	тодэммы вал	тодӥськеммы вылэм	we had evidently known
2nd	тодэмды вал	тодӥллямды вылэм	you had evidently known
3rd	тодэмзы вал	тодӥллям(зы) вылэм	they had evidently known

The negative pluperfect II is formed either by with the preterite II third person singular of the main verb in the negative (marked with -мтэ-) with a personal possessive suffix and the auxiliary verb вал (pluperfect II a) or with the negative preterite II of the main verb marked with -мтэ- with the preterite II auxiliary verb вылэм.

Preterite II negative (тодыны)
Person	Pluperfect II a	Pluperfect II b	English
Singular
1st	тодымтэе вал	тодӥськымтэе вылэм	I had evidently not known
2nd	тодымтэед вал	тодымтэед вылэм	you had evidently known
3rd	тодымтэ вал	тодымтэ вылэм	he/she had evidently known
Plural
1st	тодымтэмы вал	тодӥськымтэмы вылэм	we had evidently not known
2nd	тодымтэды вал	тодӥллямтэды вылэм	you had evidently not known
3rd	тодымтэзы вал	тодӥллямтэ вылэм	they had evidently not known

===== Durative preterite =====
The durative preterite in Udmurt can be compared to the past progressive in English "was doing". Its function can be described as expressing a process in the past. The structure is the present tense of the main verb with either preterite of the auxiliary verb. The structure of the negative durative preterite is the negative present tense of the main verb with either preterite of the auxiliary verb.

Durative preterite (кырӟаны)
Person	Affirmative	English	Negative	English
Singular
1st	кырӟасько вал/вылэм	I was singing	уг кырӟаськы вал/вылэм	I was not singing
2nd	кырӟаськод вал/вылэм	you were singing	уд кырӟаськы вал/вылэм	you were not singing
3rd	кырӟа вал/вылэм	he/she was singing	уг кырӟа вал/вылэм	he/she was not singing
Plural
1st	кырӟаськомы вал/вылэм	we were singing	ум кырӟаське вал/вылэм	we were not singing
2nd	кырӟаськоды вал/вылэм	you were singing	уд кырӟаське вал/вылэм	you were not singing
3rd	кырӟало вал/вылэм	they were singing	уг кырӟало вал/вылэм	they were not singing

===== Frequentative preterite =====
The frequentative preterite in Udmurt expresses a repeated action in the past. The structure is the future tense of the main verb with either preterite of the auxiliary verb. The structure of the negative frequentative preterite is the negative future tense of the main verb with either preterite of the auxiliary verb.

Frequentative preterite (кырӟаны)
Person	Affirmative	English	Negative	English
Singular
1st	кырӟало вал/вылэм	I sang (always)	уг кырӟа вал/вылэм	I did not sing (always)
2nd	кырӟалод вал/вылэм	you sang (always)	уд кырӟа вал/вылэм	you did not sing (always)
3rd	кырӟалоз вал/вылэм	he/she sang (always)	уз кырӟа вал/вылэм	he/she did not sing (always)
Plural
1st	кырӟаломы вал/вылэм	we sang (always)	ум кырӟалэ вал/вылэм	we did not sing (always)
2nd	кырӟалоды вал/вылэм	you sang (always)	уд кырӟалэ вал/вылэм	you did not sing (always)
3rd	кырӟалозы вал/вылэм	they sang (always)	уз кырӟалэ вал/вылэм	they did not sing (always)

=== Passive voice ===
Udmurt does not have a separate affix to express a passive voice. The plural third person of the verb is used as a personal form to express an unknown, non-determinative actor.

Passive voice
3rd pers. pl	English	Passive voice	English
Соос ужало	They are working	Татын ужало	(People) are working here
Соос удмурт сямен верасько	They speak Udmurt	Татын удмурт сямен верасько	Udmurt is spoken here
Соос ӟуч сямен уг верасько	They do not speak Russian	Татын ӟуч сямен уг верасько	Russian is not spoken here

=== Moods ===
==== Conditional ====
The conditional mood expresses an unrealistic action which the speaker considers to be supposed, possible or hopeful. The conditional marker is -сал and is attached to the stem of the verb (i.e. full stem of conjugation I verbs) along with personal endings. The third person singular, however, can function without a personal ending. The first person singular preterite I negative verb ӧй is used in the negative conditional.

Conditional (карыны)
Person	Affirmative	English	Negative	English
Singular
1st	карысал	I would do	ӧй карысал	I would not do
2nd	карысалыд	you would do	ӧй карысалыд	you would not do
3rd	карысал(ыз)	he/she would do	ӧй карысал(ыз)	he/she would not do
Plural
1st	карысалмы	we would do	ӧй карысалмы	we would not do
2nd	карысалды	you would do	ӧй карысалды	you would not do
3rd	карысалзы	they would do	ӧй карысалзы	they would not do

==== Imperative ====
The stem of the verb is used for the second person singular imperative in Udmurt. If the stem of a conjugation I verb ends in one consonant or is one syllable and ends in a vowel, the short stem is the imperative. If the stem of a conjugation I verb ends in two consonants, the full stem is used.

The second person plural infinitive is marked with -е(лэ)/-э(лэ) in conjugation I verbs and -лэ in conjugation I verbs.

The imperative negative auxiliary is эн which precedes the infinitive form.

Imperative
Person	сиыны (conjugation I)	English	басьтыны (conjugation I)	English	вераны (conjugation II)	English
Singular
2nd	си!	eat!	басьты!	take/buy!	вера!	talk/speak!
Plural
2nd	сие(лэ)!	eat!	басьтэ(лэ)!	take/buy!	вералэ!	talk/speak!
Negative singular
2nd	эн си!	do not eat!	эн басьты!	do not take/buy!	эн вера!	do not talk/speak!
Negative plural
2nd	эн сие(лэ)!	do not eat!	эн басьтэ(лэ)!	do not take/buy!	эн вералэ!	do not talk/speak!

==== Optative ====
An optative mood is used in certain dialects.

=== Modals ===
Udmurt makes use of the morphosyntactic structure of inflected nominals and verbs with an auxiliary for modal expressions.

To express ability, the verb луыны, 'to be' is inflected in the third person singular (in all tenses) with the subject in the genitive case. The verb to which the subject directs ability is inflected with the past participle (э)м/(е)м (preterite II, third person singular) with a personal possessive suffix.

Udmurt	English	Literal translation
Тынад лыктемед луиз	You could come	"yours your came was"
Кышномуртлэн магазинэ мынемез ӧз луы	The woman could not go to the store	"woman's to the store her went was not"

==== Desiderative ====
The desiderative modal expresses desire. The verb потынын, 'to want' is inflected in the third person singular (in all tenses) with the subject in the genitive case. The verb to which the subject directs the desire is inflected with the past participle (э)м/(е)м (preterite II, third person singular) with a personal possessive suffix.

Udmurt	English	Literal translation
Мынам иземе потэ	I want to sleep	"mine my slept wants"
Кышномуртлэн магазинэ мынемез уг поты	The woman does not want to go to the store	"woman's to the store her went not want"

==== Necessive ====
To express necessity, the word кулэ, 'necessary' is used with the copula verb inflected in the third person singular (in all tenses) with the subject in the dative case. The infinitive of the verb to which the subject directs necessity or an object is used.

Udmurt	English	Literal translation
Солы трос лыдӟиськыны кулэ	He/she needs to read a lot	"to him/her much to read necessity is"
Мыным книга кулэ ӧвӧл	I did not need a book	"to me book necessity is not"

==== Permissive ====
To express permissiveness, the verb яраны, 'to suit/to be valid' is inflected in the third person singular (in all tenses) with the subject in the dative case. The infinitive of the verb to which the subject directs permissiveness is used.

Udmurt	English	Literal translation
Мыным кошкыны яра-а?	May I leave?	"to me to leave suits?"
Тӥледлы пырыны уг яра	You (pl) may not come in	"to you (pl) to come in does not suit"

=== Participles ===
Udmurt verbs have past, present and future participles. Participles can be used in different ways than ordinary adjectives. In addition to affirmative participles, Udmurt also has caritive participles.

==== Present ====
The present participle is -(ӥ)сь/-(и)сь. It is a participle which expresses continuous action. It is affixed to short stems in conjugation I verbs. The present participle caritive is -(ӥ)сьтэм/-(и)сьтэм

Affirmative	English	Caritive	English
лыдӟись ныл	a girl that reads	лыдӟисьтэм ныл	a girl that does not read
кырӟась пи	a boy that sings	кырӟасьтэм пи	a boy that does not sing

In addition to functioning as regular attributive participles, the present participle also functions as a nominalising derivational suffix.

as a participle	English	as a noun	English
дышетскись ныл	a girl that studies	дышетскись	student
висись ныл	a girl that gets sick	висись	patient
кырӟась ныл	a girl that sings	кырӟась	singer

==== Past ====
The past participle is -(э)м/-(е)м. It is an attributive participle which expresses completed action. It is affixed to short stems in conjugation I verbs. The past participle caritive is -(э)мтэ/-(е)мтэ.

Affirmative	English	Caritive	English
лыктэм куно	a guest that arrived	лыктэмтэ куно	a guest who did not arrive
пограм писпу	a tree that fell	пограмтэ писпу	a tree that did not fall
лыӟем книга	a book that has been read	лыӟемтэ книга	a book that has not been read

The past participle can also be inflected with the inessive ending -(э)мын/-(е)мын. This is a predicative participle which expresses completed action.

Udmurt	English
Куно лыктэмын.	The guest has arrived.
Писпу пограмын.	The tree had fallen.
Книга лыӟемын.	The book has been read.

==== Future ====
The modal-future participle is -(о)но. It is affixed to short stems in conjugation I verbs. The future participle caritive is -(о)нтэм and expresses that which is unable to be done.

Affirmative	English	Caritive	English
пияно кышномурт	a woman who will give birth soon	пиянтэм кышномурт	a woman who will not be able to give birth
лыӟоно книга	a book that will be read	лыӟонтэм книга	a book that is not able to be read

There is also a modal participle similar to gerunds in function. It expresses the ability to do some action or that it is possible to do the action. The marker is -мон and it is affixed to short stems in conjugation I verbs.

Udmurt	English
лэсьтымон уж	a job (work) which is possible to do
улымон корка	a house in which one can live

=== Gerunds ===
There are four gerunds in Udmurt, one being a caritive. that are affixed to the verb's full stem. One gerund, which also has a caritive, is formed by the past participle (э)м/(е)м (preterite II, third person singular) with the instrumental or elative case.

The "basic" -са gerund (and its caritive -тэк) can be compared to the English present active participle -ing and Finnish second or third infinitives, however having more functions. They can express a way of doing something, a reason for the action or a certain condition.

The temporal -ку gerund (-кы in southern dialects) expresses action or state of being which happens simultaneously with the action of the main verb of the clause.

The fourth gerund is -тозь which can express an action or an event that lasts to the starting or ending limit of the action expressed by the predicate verb of the sentence. The gerund also expresses the structure "instead of". In addition, possessive suffixes can be affixed after the -тозь gerund.

Gerunds
Udmurt	English
-са
Адями дыртыса мынэ	A person is going in a hurry (lit. rushing)
Адями дыртытэк мынэ	A person is going without rushing
дышетскись малпаськыса пуке	The student sits (there) thinking
Атае, корка пырыса, ӝӧк сьӧры пукиз	My father sat at the table when he came into the house (lit. when coming in)
-ку
Лымыяку куазь шуныгес кариське	It (lit. the weather) gets warmer when it snows
-тозь
Туннэ шунды пукськытозь ты дурын улӥмы	We were at the river bank today until sun set (lit. until the setting of the sun)
Ми вуытозь, та ужез быдэсты	Finish this work by the time we get there (lit. until the time when we arrive)
Тэк пукытозь, книга коть лыӟы	Instead of idly sitting, why do not you read a book
Вуытозям та ужез быдэсты ~ Mон вуытозь, та ужез быдэсты	Finish this work by the time I get there (lit. until the time when I arrive)

The past participle gerund is inflected with either the instrumental -(э)мен/-(е)мен (caritive -мтэен) or elative -(э)мысь/-(е)мысь (caritive -мтэысь) case, both having the basic same meaning of "because". In literary Udmurt, the gerund in the instrumental case is preferred. However, the gerund in the elative case is used with some verbs such as дугдыны 'to cease/stop'.

Gerunds
Udmurt	English
-(э)мен/-(е)мен
куазь зоремен	because it (lit. the weather) stops raining
-(э)мысь/-(е)мысь
куазь зоремысь	because it (lit. the weather) stops raining
висись ӝуштемысь дугдӥз	The patient stopped moaning (lit. from moaning)
Caritive
куазь зормтэен ~ куазь зормтэысь	because it (lit. the weather) did not stop raining

Personal possessive suffixes can also be affixed to -(э)м-/-(е)ме- gerunds:

Udmurt	English
Affirmative
Висеменым (~ висемысьтым) та ужез ас дыраз лэсьтыны ӧй быгаты	I could not complete this work on time because I was sick
Caritive
Тазэ ужез дыраз лэсьтымтэеным (~ лэсьтымтэысьтым), мукетъëсыз туж кулэ ужъëс ӝегало	Other important things got delayed because I did not to this job on time

=== Interrogative suffix ===
If there are no interrogative (question) words (who, what, when etc.), an interrogative phrase is formed by the suffix -а. The interrogative suffix is affixed to the constituent to which the question is concerned. The suffix's placement can also vary according to dialect. Both southern and northern dialect forms are used in literary Udmurt.

Interrogative suffix
Udmurt	English
Мынӥськод-а?	Are you going?
Уд-а мынӥськы? ~ Уд мынӥськы-а?	Aren't you going?
Чай юиськод-а?	Are you drinking tea?/Do you drink tea?
Чай уд-аюиськы? ~ Чай уд юиськы-а?	Don't you drink tea?
Чай-а юиськод?	Is it tea which you drink? (not e.g. coffee)
Чай-а уд юиськы?	Is it tea which you do not drink? (not e.g. coffee)
Нюлэс пичи-а?	Is the forest small?
Пичи-а нюлэс ?	Is the forest small? (but not big)
Коля студент ӧвӧл-а? ~ Ӧвӧл-а Коля студент?	Isn't Kolja a student?
Отын шур вал-а? ~ Отын вал-а шур ?	Was there a river there?
Шур мтын-а вал?	Was the river close by?
Ммтын-а шур вал?	Was the river close by? (not far away)
Шур ӧй вал-а мтын?	Wasn't the river close by?

== Word formation ==
There are a few main derivational suffixes in Udmurt word formation.

=== Nouns ===
Udmurt has the productive deverbalising nominal suffix -(о)н/-(ë)н. -(о)н/-(ë)н is affixed to the short stem of conjugation I verbs and -н affixes directly to the stem of conjugation II verbs The function of this suffix is quite diverse. With this deverbalising affix, the nominal usually:

1. expresses the action (deverbalised noun) set out by the base verb:

Verb	English	Noun	English
сылыны	to stand	сылон	(a) standing
ӝуаны	to burn	ӝуан	(a) burning
куасьмыны	to dry	куасьмон	(a) drying

2. expresses the result of action:

Verb	English	Noun	English
вормыны	to win	вормон	a victory
кырӟаны	to sing	кырӟан	a song

3. expresses an instrument or tool denoted by an action:

Verb	English	Noun	English
портыны	to drill	портон	a drill

4. expresses the focus of action:

Verb	English	Noun	English
сиыны	to eat	сиëн	food
юыны	to drink	юон	drink

Most of these derivations have both abstract and concrete meanings. The derivation can expresses both the action set out by the base verb or result or instrument:

Verb	English	Noun	English
пукыны	to sit	пуконы	(a) sitting, a seat, a chair
висьыны	to become ill	висëн	getting ill, a disease, an illness
шудыны	to play	шудон	playing, play, a toy, a plaything

Deverbalised nominal derivations can function as qualifiers of collocations, such as лыдӟон книга 'reader, digest' or юон ву 'drinking water'.

=== Adjectives ===
Udmurt has the denominalising adjectival suffixes -о/-ë and carritive -тэм. The adjectives formed by the suffix -о/-ë express the condition of a quality, feature or phenomenon of the base word or possession of the referent. The adjectives formed by the suffix -тэм express the lack of quality, feature, phenomenon or referent. This suffix can be compared to the prefix un- or suffix -less in English.

Adjectival derivational suffixes
Nominal	English	Example	English
-о/-ë
визь	sense	визьмо адями	a wise person
кужым	strength	кужымо ки	a strong hand
шуд	luck	шудо нылпи	a lucky child
куар	leaf	куаро писпу	a leafy tree (a tree with leaves)
туш	beard	тушо пиосмурт	a bearded man (a man with a beard)
-тэм
шуд	luck	шудтэм нылпчагыр	an unlucky child
туш	beard	туштэм пиосмурт	a beardless man (a man with no beard)
нылпи	child	нылпитэм семъя	a childless family (a family with no children)

Adjectives formed by the -ӧ suffix can also have a qualifier:

Nominal	English	Example	English
чагыр син	blue eye	чагыр сино ныл	a blue-eyed girl
кузь ки	long arm	кузь киë адями	a long-armed person (a person with long arms)

Udmurt also has moderative adjectival suffixes (-алэс, -мыт and -пыр(ъем)) which express a somewhat large, but not complete, amount of quality of an adjective base, usually a colour or flavour. They can be compared to the English suffix -ish. The suffix -мыт does not normally associate with flavour, but Southern dialect variant -пыр(ъем) does.

Moderative adjectival derivational suffixes
Nominal	English	Example	English
вож	green	вожалэс ~ вожмыт ~ вожпыръем дэрем	a greenish shirt
лыз	blue	лызалэс ~ лызмыт ~ лызпыръем кышет	a blueish scarf
сьӧд	black	сьӧдалэс ~ сьӧдмыт ~ сьӧдпыръем йырси	blackish hair
курыт	bitter	курыталэс ~ курытпыръем кияр	a rather bitter cucumber

=== Verbs ===
In Udmurt grammar, the lexical aspect (aktionsart) of verbs is called verbal aspect. Udmurt verbs can be divided into two categories: momentane verbs and frequentative verbs. The transitivity or of a verb mainly relies on if the verb is frequentative or not.

In Udmurt word formation, verbs can be derived by frequentative or causative deverbalising suffixes.

==== Momentane ====
The momentane aspect of Udmurt verbs expresses action (state of being or process) that happens only once. There is no transparent base momentane marker (cf. Finnish momentane verbs). For example, лыӟыны 'to read (once)'. However a causative -т- denotes momentanity and those verbs can be derived into frequentative verbs.

==== Frequentative ====
The frequentative aspect expresses that the action (state of being or process) does not happen just one time. The action is continuous or frequent. There are various frequentative markers, usually containing an л, for example лыӟылыны 'to read (frequently/often)'. The frequentative aspect, however, does not denote continuous repetitiveness as in e.g.some Finnish frequentative derivations.

The frequentative deverbalising affixes in Udmurt are -лы- (conjugation I), -лля- (conjugation II) (both historically related to the Finnish frequentative derivational suffix -ele-) and -а-/-я- (conjugation I) which precede the infinitive marker ны.

Frequentative derivation
Base	English		Derivation	English
-л-
лыдӟыны	to read	→	лыдӟылыны	to read (often)
лыктыны	to come	→	лыктылыны	to come (often)
юыны	to drink	→	юылыны	to drink (often)
-лля-
ужаны	to work	→	ужалляны	to work (often)
кораны	to chop	→	коралляны	to chop (often)
-а-/-я-
пырыны	to step inside	→	пыраны	to step inside (often)
потыны	to step outside	→	потаны	to step outside (often)
гожтыны	to write	→	гожтъяыны	to write (often)

Some verbal derivations, that follow the pattern потыны → потаны, have parallel frequentative derivations, and -лля- can be affixed to an already frequentative derivation:

тубыны 'to rise' → тубылыны 'to rise (often)'

тубыны 'to rise' → тубаны → тубалляны 'to rise (often)'

Another frequentative verb affix is -иськы-/-ӥськы-, which is historically related to the Finnish frequentative derivational suffix -skele-. -иськы-/-ӥськы- frequentative verbs can be considered different from the above-mentioned derivations. -иськы-/-ӥськы- verbs do not semantically denote frequency in the same way; their "oftenness" is related to objective or non-objective relation. For example, the verb лыдӟыны ('to read') requires an object and the verb лыдӟиськыны does not.

Udmurt	English
мон лыдӟиськыны яратӥсько	I like to read (generally)
мон книга лыдӟӥсько	I am reading a book

== Syntax ==
Udmurt is an SOV language.

=== Nominal sentence ===
The copular verb (вань vań, – "to be") is omitted if the sentence is in the present tense: туннэ кыӵе нунал? tunne kiče nunal? ("What day is it today?"). If the sentence expresses possession, the vań can be part of the predicate: тӥ палан нюлэсъёс вань-а? ti palan ńulesjos vań-a? ("At you (plur.), are there forests?")

=== Existential sentences ===
These are sentences which introduce a new subject – they often begin with 'there is' or 'there are' in English.

Udmurt	English	Literal translation
Финляндиын трос нюлэсъëс	there are many forests in Finland	"in Finland many forests (is/are)"

=== Possessive sentences ===
As in most Uralic languages, ownership in Udmurt is expressed by inflection and sentence structure, rather than with a separate verb 'have'. The owner of the object and the possessed object are both inflected with a possessive suffix and used with the copula verb to express ownership.

Udmurt	English	Literal translation
мынам книгае вань	I have a book	"mine my book is"
мынам книгае ӧвӧл	I do not have a book	"mine my book is not"
мынам книгае вал	I had a book	"mine my book was"
мынам книгае ӧй вал	I did not have a book	"mine my book was not"

== Sources ==
- Kel'makov, Valentin; Sara Hännikäinen (2008). Udmurtin kielioppia ja harjoituksia (in Finnish) (2nd ed.). Helsinki: Suomalais-Ugrilainen Seura. ISBN 978-952-5150-34-6.
- Winkler, Eberhard (2011). Udmurtische Grammatik (in German). Wiesbaden: Harrassowitz.
- Winkler, Eberhard (2001). Udmurt. Languages of the World. Vol. Materials 212. München: Lincom Europa.
- Tánczos, Orsolya (2010). "Szórendi variációk és lehetséges okaik az udmurtban" [Word order variation and its possible causes in Udmurt] (PDF). Nyelvtudományi Közlemények (in Hungarian). 107: 218–229.
