= Lacuna =

Lacuna (plural lacunas or lacunae) may refer to:

== Related to the meaning "gap" ==
- Lacuna (manuscripts), a gap in a manuscript, inscription, text, painting, or musical work
  - Great Lacuna, a lacuna of eight leaves in the Codex Regius where there was heroic Old Norse poetry
- Lacuna (music), an intentional, extended passage in a musical work during which no notes are played
- Scientific lacuna, an area of science that has not been studied but has potential to be studied
- Lacuna or accidental gap, in linguistics, a word that does not exist but which would be permitted by the rules of a language
- Lacuna, in law, largely overlapping a non liquet ("it is not clear"), a gap (in the law)

=== In medicine ===
- Lacuna (histology), a small space containing an osteocyte in bone, or chondrocyte in cartilage
- Muscular lacuna, a lateral compartment of the thigh
- Vascular lacuna, a medial compartment beneath the inguinal ligament
- Lacuna magna, the largest of several recesses in the urethra

== Other uses ==
- Lacuna (album), by Childhood, 2014
- Lacuna (comics), a fictional Marvel Comics character
- Lacuna (film), a 2012 Chinese romantic comedy film
- Lacuna (gastropod), a genus of sea snails in the family Littorinidae
- Lacuna (The Church album), 2026
- Helcogramma lacuna (H. lacuna), a species of fish in the genus Helcogramma
- Mallomonas lacuna (M. lacuna), a species of heterokont algae
- Lacuna Island, Antarctica
- Jessie Lacuna (born 1993), a Filipino swimmer
- The Lacuna, a 2009 novel by Barbara Kingsolver
- Lacuna, Inc., a fictional company in the 2004 film Eternal Sunshine of the Spotless Mind
- Lacuna, the name of several lakes of Titan, the moon of Saturn

== See also ==
- Lacuna model, a tool for unlocking culture differences or missing "gaps" in text
- Lacunar amnesia, loss of memory about one specific event
- Lacunar stroke, in medicine, the most common type of stroke
- Lacuna Coil, an Italian hard rock/metal band
- Lacunary function, an analytic function in mathematics
- Lacunarity, a mathematical measure of the extent that a pattern contains gaps
- Lacunary polynomial, or sparse polynomial
- Petrovsky lacuna, in mathematics
- Laguna (disambiguation)
