= Komi grammar =

Grammar of the Komi language

This article deals with the grammar of the Komi language of the northeastern European part of Russia (the article "Komi language" discusses the language in general and contains a quick overview of the language).

== Pronouns ==
Komi pronouns are inflected much in the same way that nouns are. However, personal pronouns are usually only inflected in the grammatical cases and cannot be inflected in the locative cases.

=== Personal pronouns ===
Komi personal pronouns inflect in the grammatical cases and the approximative case. Personal pronouns in the nominative case are listed in the following table:

Personal pronouns
Komi		English
Singular
ме	[ˈme]	I
тэ	[ˈte]	you
сійӧ	[ˈsijɘ]	he/she/it
Plural
ми	[ˈmi]	we
ті	[ˈti]	you
найӧ	[ˈnajɘ]	they

== Nominals ==
As with other languages in the Uralic family, Komi does not encode grammatical gender. Nouns and personal pronouns make no gender distinction; сійӧ/sijö means both 'he' and 'she', depending on the referent.

=== Cases ===
Komi has seventeen noun cases: nine core grammatical cases and eight locative cases. The locative cases are usually only used with inanimate references with the exception of the elative, terminative, approximative and egressive cases. There is no difference in the meaning of the translative and prolative cases.

Komi cases
Case	Suffix		English prep.	Example		Translation
Core grammatical cases
nominative	—		-	керка	[ˈkerka]	house
genitive	-лӧн	[-lɘn]	of / 's	керкалӧн	[ˈkerkalɘn]	of a house / house's
accusative	-ӧс	[-ɘs]	-	керкаӧс	[ˈkerkaɘs]	house (as an object)
ablative	-лысь	[-lɯɕ]	from	керкалысь	[ˈkerkalɯɕ]	from a house
dative	-лы	[-lɯ]	to/for	керкалы	[ˈkerkalɯ]	to a house
instrumental	-ӧн	[-ɘn]	with/by means of	керкаӧн	[ˈkerkaɘn]	by means of a house
comitative	-кӧд	[-kɘd]	with/accompanied by	керкакӧд	[ˈkerkakɘd]	with a house
caritive	-тӧг	[-tɘɡ]	without	керкатӧг	[ˈkerkatɘɡ]	without a house
consecutive	-ла	[-la]	gone/come for	керкала	[ˈkerkala]	for a house
Locative cases
inessive	-ын	[-ɯn]	in	керкаын	[ˈkerkaɯn]	in a house
illative	-ӧ	[-ɘ]	into	керкаӧ	[ˈkerkaɘ]	into a house
elative	-ысь	[-ɯɕ]	out of	керкаысь	[ˈkerkaɯɕ]	out of a house
translative	-ті	[-ti]	along	керкаті	[ˈkerkati]	along a house
prolative	-ӧд	[-ɘd]	along	керкаӧд	[ˈkerkaɘd]	along a house
terminative	-ӧдз	[-ɘdʑ]	end up	керкаӧдз	[ˈkerkaɘdʑ]	end up at a house
approximative	-лань	[-laɲ]	towards	керкалань	[ˈkerkalaɲ]	towards a house
egressive	-сянь	[-ɕaɲ]	starting from	керкасянь	[ˈkerkaɕaɲ]	starting from a house

==== Stem extension ====
Preceding suffixes that start with a vowel, nouns may use an extended stem.

Nouns ending in в often change this consonant to л, e.g. ныв ("girl") → нылыс ("his/her girl").

Some nouns ending in дз, дь and ль undergo gemination, e.g.:

видз ("lawn") → виддзыд ("your lawn");
додь ("sled") → доддьыс ("his sled");
куль ("demon") → кулльысь ("from a demon").

Another group of nouns undergoes epenthesis, e.g.:

пон ("dog") → понйыс ("his/her dog");
ун ("dream") → унмӧн ("by means of a dream");
ош ("bear") → ошкысь ("from a bear");
гӧп ("puddle") → гӧптын ("in a puddle");
кыв ("language") → кывйын ("his/her language").

==== Personal pronouns ====
The declension of personal pronouns is quite systematic as well:

Komi personal pronoun declensions
Case	1st pers. sing.	2nd pers. sing.	3rd pers. sing.	1st pers. pl	2nd pers. pl.	3rd pers pl.
nominative	ме	тэ	сійӧ	ми	ті	найӧ
genitive	менам	тэнад	сылӧн	миян	тіян	налӧн
accusative	менӧ	тэнӧ	сійӧс	миянӧс	тіянӧс	найӧс
ablative	менсьым	тэнсьыд	сылысь	миянлысь	тіянлысь	налысь
dative	меным	тэныд	сылы	миянлы	тіянлы	налы
instrumental	меӧн	тэӧн	сыӧн	миянӧн	тіянӧн	наӧн
comitative	мекӧд	тэкӧд	сыкӧд	миянкӧд	тіянкӧд	накӧд
caritive	метӧг	тэтӧг	сытӧг	миянтӧг	тіянтӧг	натӧг
consecutive	мела	тэла	сыла	миянла	тіянла	нала
elative	меысь	тэысь	сыысь	миянысь	тіянысь	наысь
terminative	меӧдз	тэӧдз	сыӧдз	миянӧдз	тіянӧдз	наӧдз
approximative	мелань	тэлань	сылань	миянлань	тіянлань	налань
egressive	месянь	тэсянь	сысянь	миянсянь	тіянсянь	насянь

=== Plural ===
There are two types of nominal plurals in Komi. One is the plural for nouns -яс (with the exception of -ян in пиян, "the sons / boys" and -ана/-яна in words ending on -анин/-янин, e.g. зыряна, "Zyrians") and the other is the plural for adjectives -ӧсь.

==== Nominal plural ====
In attributive plural phrases, the noun is always in plural, while the adjective is not required to be in the plural:

Attributive plural
Komi	English
мича(ӧсь) нывъяс	(the) beautiful girls

The plural marker always comes before other endings (i.e. cases and possessive suffixes) in the morphological structure of plural nominal.

Morphological order
Komi	English
нывъяслы	to the girls

Since -яс, -ян and -яна start with a soft vowel, they may be preceded by either a hard sign (ъ) or a soft sign (ь), depending on the preceding letter:

Morphological order
Komi	English
ва; ваяс	water; waters
ун; унъяс	dream; dreams
лӧдз; лӧдзьяс	horsefly; horseflies

==== Predicative plural ====
As in Hungarian, if the subject is plural, the adjective is always plural when it functions as the sentence's predicative:

Attributive plural
Komi	English
нывъяс мичаӧсь	the girls are beautiful
керкаяс ыджыдӧсь	the houses are big

=== Possessive suffixes ===
==== Nominal possessive suffixes ====
Komi possessive suffixes are added to the end of nouns either before or after a case ending. The possessive suffixes vary in the nominative and accusative cases and with case endings.

Nominative possessive suffix
Suffix ending	Komi	English
-ӧй	ёртӧй	my friend
-ыд	ёртыд	your (sg.) friend
-ыс	ёртыс	his/her friend
-ным	ёртным	our friend
-ныд	ёртныд	your (pl.) friend
-ныс	ёртныс	their friend

==== Accusative possessive suffixes ====
Accusative possessive suffixes are shown in the following table. Note that the possessive of the first person in the accusative matches the simple accusative.

Accusative possessive suffix
Suffix ending	Komi	English
-ӧс	ёртӧс	my friend
-тӧ	ёрттӧ	your (sg.) friend
-сӧ	ёртсӧ	his/her friend
-нымӧс	ёртнымӧс	our friend
-нытӧ	ёртнытӧ	your (pl.) friend
-нысӧ	ёртнысӧ	their friend

== Verbs ==
Komi infinitives are marked with -ны. as in мунны, 'to go'. Some infinitives have a so called connecting vowel ы which is dropped in the verbal stem when affixing, for example, a personal ending such as in the verb велӧдчыны ‘to study’ → велӧдча 'I study'.

There is one phoneme which undergoes consonant gradation when adding a suffix beginning with a vowel. This change is в → л as in овны ‘to live’ → олан ‘you live’. Another exception is the verb локны, which has an epenthetic [t] added before a suffix beginning with a vowel, e.g. локтан ‘you come’.

The indicative mood has four tenses: present, future and two past tenses. In addition, there are four past tense structures which include auxiliary verbs. Verbs are negated by use of an auxiliary negative verb that conjugates with personal endings. Separate personal pronouns are not required in verb phrases.

=== Present tense ===
The verbal personal markers in the Komi present tense are:

Personal endings of verbs
Person	Ending	
	Singular	Plural
1st	-а	-ам
2nd	-ан	-анныд
3rd	-ӧ	-ӧны

Present tense
Person	уджавны	English
Singular
1st	уджала	I work
2nd	уджалан	you work
3rd	уджалӧ	he/she works
Plural
1st	уджалам	we work
2nd	уджаланныд	you work
3rd	уджалӧны	they work

The negative indicative present is formed by the auxiliary о- negative verb and the verbal stem in the first person and with -ӧй in the first and second person plural and -ны in the third person plural.

The negative verb conjugates with the ending -г in first person, -н in the second person and -з in the third person. The first and second person plural is marked with -ӧ.

Present tense negative
Person	уджавны	English
Singular
1st	ог уджав	I do not work
2nd	он уджав	you do not work
3rd	оз уджав	he/she does not work singing
Plural
1st	огӧ уджалӧй	we do not work
2nd	онӧ уджалӧй	you (pl) do not work
3rd	оз уджавны	they do not work

=== Future tense ===
The affirmative and negative future tense in Komi is basically the same as in the present with the exception of the third person in the affirmative, ending in -ас (singular) and -асны (plural):

уджалас	he/she will work
уджаласны	they will work

=== Past tense ===
The conventionally used designations preterite and perfect are used with denotations which are divergent from their usual meanings in the grammar of other languages.

==== Preterite I ====
The first preterite can be compared with the simple past in English. Preterite I is marked with і/и.

Preterite I
Person	уджавны	English
Singular
1st	уджалі	I worked
2nd	уджалін	you worked
3rd	уджаліс	he/she worked
Plural
1st	уджалім	we worked
2nd	уджалінныд	you worked
3rd	уджалісны	they worked

The negative preterite I is formed by the auxiliary э- negative verb with the same personal endings as in present tense. The main verb is the same as in the present tense

Preterite I negative
Person	уджавны	English
Singular
1st	эг уджав	I did not work
2nd	эн уджав	you did not work
3rd	эз уджав	he/she did not work
Plural
1st	эгӧ уджалӧй	we did not work
2nd	энӧ уджалӧй	you did not work
3rd	эз уджавны	they did not work

==== Preterite II ====
The second preterite is a past tense with an evidentiality distinction. It can be compared to the English perfect in which the speaker did not personally observe the past event. The preterite II is marked with -ӧм-, which is historically related to the third infinitive in Finnish.

Preterite II
Person	уджавны	English
Singular
1st	уджалӧма	I evidently worked
2nd	уджалӧмыд	you evidently worked
3rd	уджалӧма	he/she evidently worked
Plural
1st	уджалӧмаӧсь	we evidently worked
2nd	уджалӧманыд	you evidently worked
3rd	уджалӧмаӧсь/уджалӧмны	they evidently worked

The negative preterite II is formed by including the auxiliary copular negative verb абу 'is not', e.g. абу уджалӧма (I have evidently not worked), абу уджалӧмыд (you have evidently not worked) etc.

==== Auxiliary past tenses ====
There are four past tenses in Komi which use a preterite form of the main verb and a preterite form of the auxiliary verb 'to be'.

===== Preterite III =====
The Komi preterite III makes use of the main verb in the present tense and the auxiliary вӧлі, 'was' in third person singular, in simple past. The pluperfect I tense expresses a continuation of action that has happened in the (distant) past.

Preterite III
Person	уджавны	English
Singular
1st	вӧлі уджала	I was working
2nd	вӧлі уджалан	you were working
3rd	вӧлі уджалӧ	he/she was working
Plural
1st	вӧлі уджалам	we were working
2nd	вӧлі уджаланныд	you were working
3rd	вӧлі уджалӧны	they were working

The negative preterite III is formed by including the auxiliary copular verb вӧлі ‘was' with the main verb in the present negative.

Preterite III negative
Person	уджавны	English
Singular
1st	вӧлі ог уджав	I was not working
2nd	вӧлі он уджав	you were not working
3rd	вӧлі оз уджав	he/she was not working
Plural
1st	вӧлі огӧ уджалӧй	we was not working
2nd	вӧлі онӧ уджалӧй	you were not working
3rd	вӧлі оз уджавны	they were not working

===== Preterite IV =====
The Komi preterite IV (pluperfect) makes use of the main verb in the preterite II form and the auxiliary вӧлі, 'was' in third person singular, in simple past. The preterite IV tense expresses an evidently completed action that has happened in the (distant) past.

Preterite IV
Person	уджавны	English
Singular
1st	вӧлі уджалӧма	I have evidently worked
2nd	вӧлі уджалӧмыд	you have evidently worked
3rd	вӧлі уджалӧма	he/she has evidently worked
Plural
1st	вӧлі уджалӧмаӧсь	we have evidently worked
2nd	вӧлі уджалӧманыд	you have evidently worked
3rd	вӧлі уджалӧмаӧсь/уджалӧмны	they have evidently worked

The negative preterite IV is formed by including the auxiliary copular negative verb абу 'is not', e.g. вӧлі абу уджалӧма (I have evidently not worked), вӧлі абу уджалӧмыд (you have evidently not worked) etc.

===== Preterite V =====
The Komi preterite V makes use of the main verb in the present form and the auxiliary вӧлӧм, 'apparently was' in third person singular, preterite II. The preterite V tense expresses an evidently continuous action that has happened in the (distant) past.

Present tense
Person	уджавны	English
Singular
1st	вӧлӧм уджала	I was evidently working
2nd	вӧлӧм уджалан	you were evidently working
3rd	вӧлӧм уджалӧ	he/she was evidently working
Plural
1st	вӧлӧм уджалам	we were evidently working
2nd	вӧлӧм уджаланныд	you were evidently working
3rd	вӧлӧм уджалӧны	they were evidently working

The negative preterite V is formed by including the auxiliary copular verb вӧлӧм 'evidently was' with the main verb in the present negative.

Preterite V negative
Person	уджавны	English
Singular
1st	вӧлӧм ог уджав	I was not evidently working
2nd	вӧлӧм он уджав	you were not evidently working
3rd	вӧлӧм оз уджав	he/she was not evidently working
Plural
1st	вӧлӧм огӧ уджалӧй	we were not evidently working
2nd	вӧлӧм онӧ уджалӧй	you were not evidently working
3rd	вӧлӧм оз уджавны	they were not evidently working

===== Preterite VI =====
The Komi preterite VI makes use of the main verb in the preterite II form and the auxiliary вӧлӧм, 'apparently was' in third person singular, preterite II. The preterite VI tense expresses an evidently completed action that has happened in the (distant) past.

Preterite VI
Person	уджавны	English
Singular
1st	вӧлӧм уджалӧма	I had evidently worked
2nd	вӧлӧм уджалӧмыд	you had evidently worked
3rd	вӧлӧм уджалӧма	he/she had evidently worked
Plural
1st	вӧлӧм уджалӧмаӧсь	we had evidently worked
2nd	вӧлӧм уджалӧманыд	you had evidently worked
3rd	вӧлӧм уджалӧмаӧсь/уджалӧмны	they had evidently worked

The negative preterite VI is formed by including the auxiliary copular negative verb абу 'is not', e.g. вӧлӧм абу уджалӧма (I had evidently not worked), вӧлӧм абу уджалӧмыд (you had evidently not worked) etc.

=== Participles ===
Komi verbs have past and present participles. These participles can also be passive or active. In addition to affirmative participles, Komi also has a caritive participle.

The present participle is -ысь. It is a participle which expresses continuous action and is always active. It is affixed to the stems of the verb.

Participle	English
велӧдысь ныв	a girl that studies
сьылысь пи	a boy that sings

In addition to functioning as regular attributive participle, the present participle also functions as a nominalizing derivational suffix.

as a participle	English	as a noun	English
велӧдысь ныв	a girl that studies	велӧдысь	student
сьылысь пи	a boy that sings	сьылысь	singer

The participle -ан/-ана denotes continuous action and can be active as in сетан ки ‘a giving hand’. It can also be passive, formed from a transitive verb with the noun acting as the object as in лыддян небӧг, 'a book being read'. The agent in the phrase is in the instrumental case: Тайӧ мамӧй вуран дӧрӧм, ’This is a shirt sewn by mother’.

The past participle is -ӧм. It is an attributive participle which expresses completed action. It can be active with the head noun as agent велӧдчӧм морт 'a learned person', passive formed from a transitive verbs велӧдчӧм урок 'a lesson that was learned', the noun acting as the object as in гижӧм небӧг 'a book that was written'. The agent in the phrase is in the instrumental case: Иван Куратовӧн гижӧм небӧг, 'A book written by Ivan Kuratov'.

The caritive participle is -тӧм.

Participle	English
гижтӧм небӧг	a book which has not been written
небӧг гижтӧм	the book cannot be written

== Sources ==
- Bartens, Raija (2000). Permiläisten kielten rakenne ja kehitys (in Finnish). Helsinki: Suomalais-Ugrilainen Seura. ISBN 952-5150-55-0.
- Hausenberg, Anu-Reet (1998), "Komi", in Abondolo, Daniel (ed.), The Uralic Languages, London and New York: Routledge, pp. 305–326, ISBN 0-415-08198-X
