= All's Well That Ends Well =

Play by Shakespeare

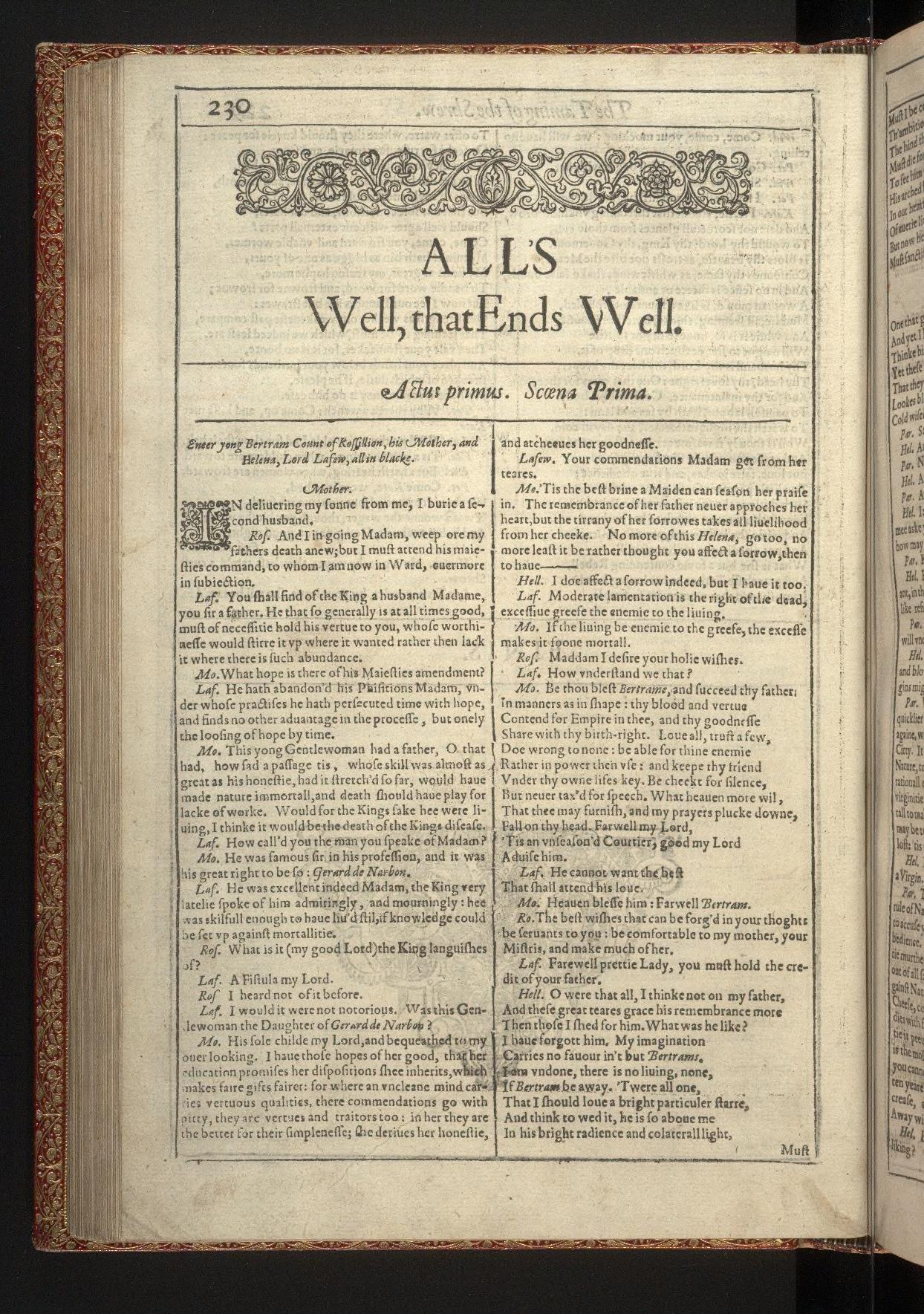
The first page of All's Well, that Ends Well from the First Folio of Shakespeare's plays, published in 1623

All's Well That Ends Well is a play by William Shakespeare, published in the First Folio in 1623, where it is listed among his comedies. There is a debate about the date of its composition, with possible dates ranging from 1598 to 1608.

The play is considered one of Shakespeare's "problem plays", those that pose ethical dilemmas that require more than typically simple solutions.

== Characters ==
- King of France
- Duke of Florence
- Bertram, Count of Roussillon
- Countess of Roussillon, Mother of Bertram
- Lavatch, a Clown in her household
- Helena, a Gentlewoman protected by the Countess
- Lafew, an old Lord
- Parolles, a follower of Bertram
- An Old Widow of Florence, surnamed Capilet
- Diana, Daughter of the Widow
- Steward of the Countess of Roussillon
- Violenta (ghost character) and Mariana, Neighbours and Friends of the Widow
- A Page
- Soldiers, Servants, Gentlemen, and Courtiers

== Synopsis ==
Helena, the low-born ward of a French-Spanish countess and daughter of a recently deceased physician, is in love with the countess's son, Bertram, who is indifferent to her. Bertram goes to Paris to replace his late father as attendant to the ailing King of France. Helena follows Bertram, ostensibly to offer the King her services as a healer. The King is sceptical. She guarantees the cure with her life: if he dies, she will be put to death, but if he lives, she may choose a husband from the court.

The King is cured and Helena chooses Bertram, who rejects her, owing to her poverty and low status. The King forces him to marry her, but after the ceremony Bertram immediately goes to war in Italy without so much as a goodbye kiss. He says he will marry her only after she has carried his child and got his family ring from him. Helena returns home to the countess, who is horrified at what her son has done, and claims Helena as her child in Bertram's place.

In Italy, Bertram is a successful warrior and becomes infatuated with Diana, the virgin daughter of an impoverished local noblewoman. Helena follows Bertram to Italy, befriends Diana, and arranges to take Diana's place in bed with him. Diana obtains Bertram's ring in exchange for one of Helena's. In this way Helena, without Bertram's knowledge, consummates their marriage and is given his ring.

Helena fakes her own death. Bertram, thinking he is free of her, comes home. He tries to marry a French lord's daughter with whom he had previously fallen in love, but Diana turns up and causes the engagement to be broken off. Helena appears and explains the ring swap, announcing that she has fulfilled Bertram's challenge; Bertram, impressed by all she has done to win him, swears his love to her. Thus all ends well.

=== Subplot ===
There is a subplot about Parolles, a disloyal friend of Bertram's. Helena, Lafew, the Countess, her fool Lavatch, and the two Lords Dumaine have all realised that Parolles is a boastful coward, but Bertram still takes him to war with him. The two Lords convince Parolles to cross into enemy territory to fetch a drum lost in battle. While he is on his way, they pose as enemy soldiers, kidnap him, blindfold him, and, with Bertram observing, get him both to betray his friends and to surrender a letter warning Diana about Bertram's lascivious character.

== Sources ==
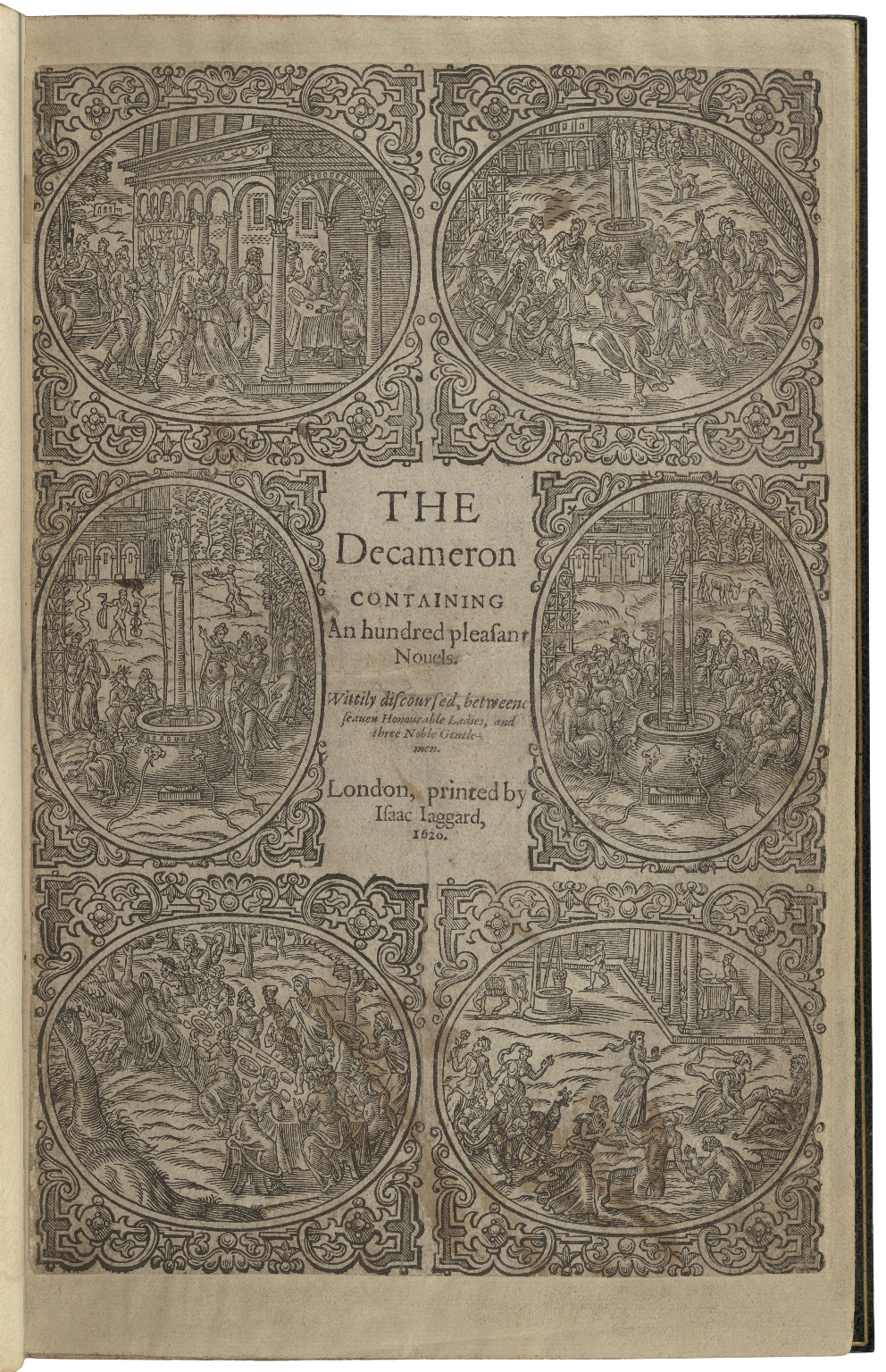
A copy of Boccaccio's The decameron containing an hundred pleasant nouels - Wittily discoursed, betweene seauen honourable ladies, and three noble gentlemen, printed by Isaac Jaggard in 1620

The play is based on the tale of Giletta di Narbona (tale nine of day three) of Boccaccio's The Decameron. F. E. Halliday speculated that Shakespeare may have read a French translation of the tale in William Painter's Palace of Pleasure.

== Analysis and criticism ==
There is no evidence that All's Well That Ends Well was popular in Shakespeare's time and it has remained one of his lesser-known plays ever since, in part due to its unorthodox mixture of fairy tale logic, gender role reversals, and cynical realism. Helena's love for the seemingly unlovable Bertram is difficult to explain on the page, but in performance, it can be made acceptable by casting an extremely attractive actor and emphasizing the possibility of a homosexual relationship between Bertram and the "clothes horse" fop, Parolles: "A filthy officer he is in those suggestions for the young earl" (Act III, scene 5). This interpretation also assists at the point in the final scene when Bertram suddenly switches from hatred to love in just one line. This is considered a particular problem for actors trained to admire psychological realism. Some alternative readings emphasise the "if" in his equivocal promise: "If she, my liege, can make me know this clearly, I'll love her dearly, ever, ever dearly." Here, there has been no change of heart at all. Productions such as London's National Theatre in 2009 have Bertram make his promise seemingly normally, but then end the play hand in hand with Helena, staring out at the audience with a look of "aghast bewilderment" suggesting he relented only to save face in front of the King.

All’s Well has been read as a play with a “Catholic aesthetic” (Woods, 2013). The play dramatizes the reality of life for many Catholics living in Jacobean England around the time of The Gunpowder Plot.

A 2018 interpretation by director Caroline Byrne at the Sam Wanamaker Playhouse, London, effects Bertram's reconciliation with Helena by having him make good his vow (Act 2 Scene 2) of taking her as his wife only when she bears his child; as well as Bertram's ring, Helena brings their infant child to their final confrontation before the king.

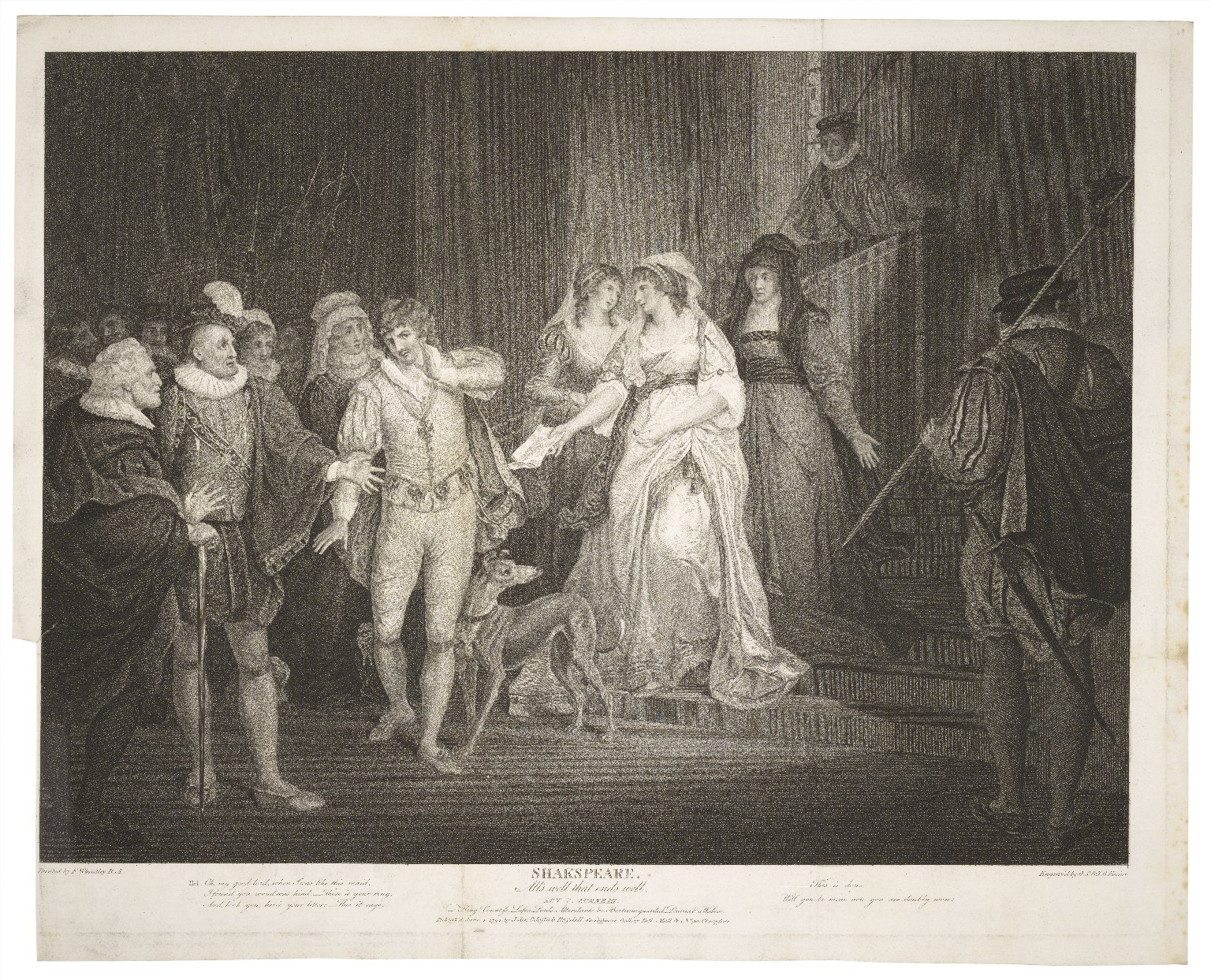
A 1794 print of the final scene

Many critics consider the truncated ending, with Bertram's sudden conversion, a flaw. Speculative explanations have been given for it. As always, there may be missing text. Some suggest that Bertram's conversion is meant to be sudden and magical in keeping with the play's 'clever wench performing tasks to win an unwilling higher-born husband' theme. Some think that Bertram is not meant to be contemptible, but merely a callow youth learning valuable lessons about values. Andrew Hadfield of the University of Sussex argues that contemporary audiences would readily have recognised Bertram's enforced marriage as a metaphor for the new requirement in 1606 for Catholics to swear an Oath of Allegiance to Protestant King James.

One character who has been admired is the Countess of Roussillon, whom Shaw thought "the most beautiful old woman's part ever written". Modern productions often are promoted as vehicles for great mature actresses; recent examples have starred Judi Dench and Peggy Ashcroft, who delivered a performance of "entranc[ing]... worldly wisdom and compassion" in Trevor Nunn's sympathetic, "Chekhovian" staging at Stratford in 1982.

In the BBC Television Shakespeare production of the play, she was played by Celia Johnson, dressed and posed as Rembrandt's portrait of Margaretha de Geer.

=== Lacuna proposed ===
Some modern editors have been inclined to presume there is a missing line, a lacuna, between Helen’s terse defense of virginity (171) and her expansive list of the endearments of lovers (172–81). There has been a vigorous recent discussion of the dating and authorship of All’s Well, with Laurie Maguire and Emma Smith arguing that the play was co-authored with Thomas Middleton and that it should be re-dated to 1606–1607 (Maguire and Smith, 2012).

== Performance history ==
No records of early performances of All's Well That Ends Well have been found. In 1741, the work was played at Goodman's Fields, with a later transfer to Drury Lane. Rehearsals at Drury Lane started in October 1741 but William Milward, playing the king, fell ill, and the opening was delayed until 22 January. Peg Woffington, playing Helena, fainted on the first night and her part was read. Milward fell ill again on 2 February and died on 6 February. This, together with unsubstantiated tales of more illnesses befalling other actresses during the run, gave the play an "unlucky" reputation, similar to that attached to Macbeth, which may have curtailed the number of revivals.

Henry Woodward (1714–1777) popularised the part of Parolles in the era of David Garrick. Sporadic performances followed in the ensuing decades, with an operatic version at Covent Garden in 1832.

The play, with plot elements drawn from romance and the ribald tale, depends on gender role conventions, both as expressed (Bertram) and challenged (Helena). With evolving conventions of gender roles, Victorian objections centred on the character of Helena, who was variously deemed predatory, immodest and both "really despicable" and a "doormat" by Ellen Terry, who also—and rather contradictorily—accused her of "hunt[ing] men down in the most undignified way". Terry's friend George Bernard Shaw greatly admired Helena's character, comparing her with the New Woman figures such as Nora in Henrik Ibsen's A Doll's House. The editor of the Arden Shakespeare volume summed up 19th-century repugnance: "everyone who reads this play is at first shocked and perplexed by the revolting idea that underlies the plot."

In 1896, Frederick S. Boas coined the term "problem play" to include the unpopular work, grouping it with Hamlet, Troilus and Cressida, and Measure for Measure.

== Awards and nominations ==
=== Original Broadway production ===
Year	Award	Category	Nominee	Result
1983	Tony Award	Best Revival		Nominated
1983	Tony Award	Best Featured Actor in a Play	Stephen Moore	Nominated
1983	Tony Award	Best Featured Actress in a Play	Margaret Tyzack	Nominated
1983	Tony Award	Best Direction of a Play	Trevor Nunn	Nominated
1983	Tony Award	Best Scenic Design	John Gunter	Nominated
1983	Tony Award	Best Costume Design	Lindy Hemming	Nominated
1983	Tony Award	Best Lighting Design	Robert Bryan	Nominated
1983	Drama Desk Award	Outstanding Revival		Nominated
1983	Drama Desk Award	Outstanding Featured Actor in a Play	Stephen Moore	Nominated
1983	Drama Desk Award	Outstanding Direction of a Play	Trevor Nunn	Won
1983	Drama Desk Award	Outstanding Set Design	John Gunter	Nominated

== See also ==
- List of idioms attributed to Shakespeare

== Bibliography ==
- Evans, G. Blakemore, The Riverside Shakespeare, 1974.
- Fraser, Russell (2003). All's Well That Ends Well. The New Cambridge Shakespeare (2 ed.). Cambridge, England: Cambridge University Press. ISBN 978-0-521-53515-1.
- Lawrence, W. W., Shakespeare's Problem Comedies, 1931.
- Price, Joseph G., The Unfortunate Comedy, 1968.
- Schoff, Francis G., "Claudio, Bertram, and a Note on Interpretation", Shakespeare Quarterly, 1959.
- Styan, J. L., Shakespeare in Performance series: All's Well That Ends Well, 1985.
