= Fossil word =

Broadly obsolete words that remain in idiomatic use

A fossil word is a word that is broadly obsolete but remains in use due to its presence in an idiom or phrase. An example of a word is 'ado' in 'much ado'. An example of a phrase is 'in point' (relevant), which is found in the phrases 'case in point' (or 'case on point' in the legal context) and 'in point of fact', but is rarely used outside of a legal context.

== English-language examples ==
- ado, as in "without further ado" or "with no further ado" or "much ado about nothing", although the homologous form "to-do" remains attested ("make a to-do", "a big to-do", etc.)
- asunder, as in "torn asunder"
- bandy, as in "bandy about" or "bandy-legged"
- bated, as in "wait with bated breath", although the derived term "abate" remains in non-idiom-specific use
- beck, as in "at one's beck and call", although the verb form "beckon" is still used in non-idiom-specific use
- betide, as in "woe betide you/us/them"
- bide, as in "bide one's time"
- champing, as in "champing at the bit", where "champ" is an obsolete precursor to "chomp", in current use
- coign, as in "coign of vantage"
- deserts, as in "just deserts", although singular "desert" in the sense of "state of deserving" occurs in nonidiom-specific contexts including law and philosophy. "Dessert" is a French loanword, meaning "removing what has been served," and has only a distant etymological connection.
- dint, as in "by dint of"
- dudgeon, as in "in high dudgeon"
- eke, as in "eke out"
- fettle, as in "in fine fettle", although the verb, 'to fettle', remains in specialized use in metal casting.
- fro, as in "to and fro"
- goodly, as in "goodly number"
- helter skelter, as in "scattered helter-skelter about the office", Middle English skelten to hasten
- inclement, as in "inclement weather"
- jetsam, as in "flotsam and jetsam", except in legal contexts (especially admiralty, property, and international law)
- kith, as in "kith and kin"
- lam, as in “on the lam”
- lo, as in "lo and behold"
- loggerheads as in "at loggerheads", loggerhead turtle, or loggerhead shrike
- madding as in "far from the madding crowd"
- math, as in "aftermath"
- muchness as in "much of a muchness"
- ne'er, as in "ne'er-do-well"
- scot, as in "scot free"
- sleight, as in "sleight of hand" is contested. Despite often appearing on list of fossil words, it is often used elsewhere.
- shebang, as in "the whole shebang", although the word is now used as an unrelated common noun in programmers' jargon.
- shrive, preserved only in inflected forms occurring only as part of fixed phrases: 'shrift' in "short shrift" and 'shrove' in "Shrove Tuesday"
- span and spick, as in "spick and span"
- turpitude, as in "moral turpitude"
- vim, as in "vim and vigor", though preserved as the name of a scouring powder
- wedlock, as in "out of wedlock"
- wend, as in "wend your way", although its former past tense "went" is still in use as the past tense of "to go"
- yore, as in "of yore", usually "days of yore"

=== "Born fossils" ===
These words were formed from other languages, by elision, or by mincing of other fixed phrases.

- caboodle, as in "kit and caboodle" (evolved from "kit and boodle", itself a fixed phrase borrowed as a unit from Dutch kitte en boedel)
- druthers, as in "if I had my druthers..." (formed by elision from "would rather" and never occurring outside this phrase to begin with)
- tarnation, as in "what in tarnation...?" (evolved in the context of fixed phrases formed by mincing of previously fixed phrases that include the term "damnation")
- nother, as in "a whole nother..." (fixed phrase formed by rebracketing another as a nother, then inserting whole for emphasis; almost never occurs outside this phrase)

== See also ==
- Archaism
- Bound morpheme
- Collocation — tendency of one word to occur near another
- Cranberry morpheme — morpheme which has no independent meaning in a lexeme
- Fossilization (linguistics)
- Irreversible binomial
