= Fossilization (linguistics) =

Concept in linguistics

In linguistic morphology, fossilization refers to two close notions. One is the preserving of ancient linguistic features which have lost their grammatical functions in language. Another is the loss of productivity of a grammatical paradigm (e.g. of an affix), which still remains in use in some words.

Examples of fossilization include fossilized morphemes and fossil words.

The term interlanguage fossilization refers to common types of errors made by most adult second-language learners, differing from the idiomatic usage of native-language learners. These are erroneous generalizations or simplified language rules, which may be classified as phonological fossilization, lexical fossilization, syntactic fossilization and pragmatic fossilization. These errors occur regardless of exposure to the language or education level.
