= Unpaired word =

Word that would appear to have a related word but does not

An unpaired word is one that, according to the usual rules of the language, would appear to have a related word but does not. Such words usually have a prefix or suffix that would imply that there is an antonym, with the prefix or suffix being absent or opposite. If the prefix or suffix is negative, such as 'dis-' or '-less', the word can be called an orphaned negative.

Unpaired words can be the result of one of the words falling out of popular usage, or can be created when only one word of a pair is borrowed from another language, in either case yielding an accidental gap, specifically a morphological gap. Other unpaired words were never part of a pair; their starting or ending phonemes, by accident, happen to match those of an existing morpheme, leading to a reinterpretation.

The classification of a word as "unpaired" can be problematic, as a word thought to be unattested might reappear in real-world usage or be created, for example, through humorous back-formation. In some cases a paired word does exist, but is quite rare or archaic (no longer in general use).

Such words – and particularly the back-formations, used as nonce words – find occasional use in wordplay, particularly light verse.

== In English ==
Word	Paired word(s)	Notes on paired word
Beautiful	Beautiless/Beautyless	Rare
Blissful	Blissless	Rare
Compassion	Passion	Not related in meaning in modern English. Passion means great enthusiasm and intense love. However, passion was the old root word of compassion, meaning suffering, with the prefix com- meaning with.
Congratulation	Gratulation	Rare. Means "the feeling of joy, pleasure". The prefix con- reflects that the joy and pleasure is experienced with others.
Delete	Lete	Not attested. Delete stems from Latin dēlētus, past participle of dēlēre (“destroy, blot out, efface”).
Disambiguate	Ambiguate (Note: Words not attested or very rare in English usage.)	Not attested. Disambiguate derives from dis- + ambigu(ous) + -ate in the mid-20th century
Discomfit	Comfit	Not an antonym. Comfit (noun) is a candy comprising a sugar-coated nut or fruit. From Old French confit, from Latin confectum meaning "put together". Discomfit probably includes some conflation with discomfort.
Disgruntle	Gruntle (Note: Jocular or facetious coinages as intentional back-formation.)	Humorous back-formation, circa 1938.
Disgusting	Gusting	Not an antonym. Gusting means "blowing with sudden, strong, and temporary bursts of wind.", and is unrelated etymologically to the "gusting" part of "disgusting" which comes from Latin, whereas "gusting" itself is Germanic.
Disheveled, Dishevelled	Sheveled, Shevelled	Not attested. Disheveled is from Old French deschevelé.
Exasperate	Asperate	Synonym. To make rough, a similar connotation to exasperate's secondary meaning of increasing the intensity of pain.
Feckless	Feckful	Used in Scottish English
Gormless	Gormful	Not attested. Gormless derives from gaumless, whose antonym gaumy is rare and highly region-specific.
Grateful	Grateless	Rare
Imbecile	Becile	Not attested.
Impeccable	Peccable	Not perfect
Improvisation	Provisation	Not attested, as something created with forethought.
Impulsive	Pulsive	Rare. Means "tending to compel; compulsory".
Incognito	Cognito	Not attested.
Incorrigible	Corrigible	Rare. Typically describes the abstract, such as a theory, rather than a person.
Indomitable	Domitable	Rare
Ineffable	Effable	Rare. Able to be uttered or expressed in words
Inert	Ert	Not attested. Inert is from Latin iners, meaning "without skill". The corresponding Latin antonym, ars, is the source of English art, which is not an antonym of inert.
Inflammable	Flammable	Synonym. From Latin flammare meaning "to catch fire". Inflammable is from Latin inflammare meaning "to cause to catch fire". Antonym is nonflammable.
Inherent	Herent	Not attested
Innocent	Nocent	Rare. Means "harmful".
Innocuous	Nocuous	Uncommon
Invincible	Vincible	Rare. Capable of being overcome or subdued.
Irritate	Ritate	Not attested
Lifeless	Lifeful	Rare
Nonchalant	Chalant	Humorous back-formation, popularized by platforms like TikTok.
Noncommittal	Committal	Not an antonym. Committal (noun) means "the process of sending someone to a mental institution".
Nonplussed	Plussed	Not attested. Nonplussed is from Latin non plus, meaning "no more".
Nonsensical	Sensical	Rare. Nonsensical is derived from nonsense.
Off-putting	Putting	Not antonyms.
Overwhelm / Underwhelm	Whelm	From Middle English whelmen meaning "to turn over". May mean "to moderately impress" in recent usage.
Peaceful	Peaceless	Rare
Postpone	Prepone	Used in Indian English
Rebuttal	Buttal	Not attested
Reckless	Reckful	Not attested
Regretful	Regretless	Rare
Repeat	Peat	Unrelated in meaning. Means a soil formed of decomposition of plant matter.
Respectful	Respectless	Rare
Rueful	Rueless	Not attested
Ruthless	Ruthful	Rare. Means 1) full of ruth; showing pity and compassion, 2) full of sorrow and misery, 3) causing pity
Sorrowful	Sorrowless	Rare. Means absence of sorrow.
Uncouth	Couth	Rare. From Old English cunnan meaning "well-known" or "familiar".
Ungainly	Gainly	Rare
Unkempt	Kempt	Rare. Kempt was replaced by passive participle combed as comb replaced kemb. While unkempt extended to grooming and hygiene generally, combed did not undergo the same extension. Appears in the form well-kempt.
Unruly	Ruly	Rare
Unscathed	Scathed	Rare
Unstinting	Stinting	Rare
Untoward	Toward	Not an antonym. Untoward evolved from figurative alterations of toward involving deviation from norms; toward acquired no similar figurative meanings.
Unwieldy	Wieldy	Rare
Worthless	Worthful	Rare

== See also ==
- Accidental gap
- Back-formation
- Cranberry morpheme
- Defective verb – other form of lexical gap
- Eggcorn
- False cognate
- Fossilization (linguistics)
- Polarity item
