= Phonemic contrast =

Phonetic differences that make meaning distinct in a given language

Phonemic contrast refers to a minimal phonetic difference, that is, small differences in speech sounds, that makes a difference in how the sound is perceived by listeners, and can therefore lead to different mental lexical entries for words. For example, whether a sound is voiced or unvoiced (consider /b/ and /p/ in English) matters for how a sound is perceived in many languages, such that changing this phonetic feature can yield a different word (consider bat and pat in English); see Phoneme. Another example in English of a phonemic contrast would be the difference between leak and league; the minimal difference of voicing between [k] and [g] does lead to the two utterances being perceived as different words. On the other hand, an example that is not a phonemic contrast in English is the difference between [sit] and [siːt]. In this case the minimal difference of vowel length is not a contrast in English and so those two forms would be perceived as different pronunciations of the same word seat.

== Phonemes and allophones ==
Different phonetic realizations of the same phoneme are called allophones. Specific allophonic variations, and the particular correspondences between allophones (realizations of speech sound) and phonemes (underlying perceptions of speech sound) can vary even within languages. For example, speakers of Quebec French often express voiceless alveolar stops (/t/) as an affricate. An affricate is a stop followed by a fricative and in this case sounds like the English 'ch' sound. While this is an allophone of a single phoneme to speakers of Quebec French, to speakers of Belgian French this is heard as a stop followed by a fricative, or in other words as two different phonemes. This was accomplished by asking Belgian French speakers to repeat an utterance containing this affricate backwards, which resulted in the production of two separate sounds. If these speakers understood the affricate as a single sound, an allophone meant to stand in for the standard pronunciation [t], and not as two consecutive sounds, they would have reproduced the affricate exactly as is when they repeated the utterance backwards.

It is important not to confuse allophones, which are different manifestations of the same phoneme in speech, with allomorphs, which are morphemes that may sound different in different contexts. An example of allomorphy would be the English plural marker /s/, which can manifest as [s], [z], and [əz] (cats [kæts], dogs [dɒgz], and horses [hoɹsəz]).

== Phonological gaps ==
An accidental gap is a phenomenon in which a form that could plausibly be found in a given language according to its rules is not present. In phonology, this is called a phonological gap, and it refers to instances in which a set of related segments containing various contrasts, e.g. between voicing (whether or not the vocal cords vibrate) or aspiration (whether a puff of air is released), is lacking a particular member. A contrast that the language could have had is then not realized within the actual language. For example, Thai has several sets of stop consonants that differ in terms of voicing and aspiration, yet the language has no voiced velar consonant [ɡ], as shown in the table of Thai stop contrasts below.

Thai stop consonants
| plain voiceless | aspirated voiceless | voiced consonant |
|---|---|---|
| p | pʰ | b |
| t | tʰ | d |
| k | kʰ | |

== Acquisition of contrasts ==
=== In infants ===
When infants acquire a first language, at first they are sensitive to all phonetic contrasts, including those that constitute phonemic contrasts not found in the language they are presently acquiring. Sensitivity to phonemic contrasts is important for word learning, and so infants will have to figure out which contrasts are important for their language and which are not. Some contrasts will confer a change in meaning between words, and others will not. Over the first year of life, infants become less sensitive to those contrasts not found in their native language. Studies have shown, however, that infants do not necessarily pay attention to phonemic differences when acquiring new lexical entries, e.g., 14-month-olds given the made-up labels "daw" and "taw" for new objects used these labels interchangeably to refer to the same object, even though they were capable of perceiving the phonetic difference between /d/ and /t/ and recognizing these as separate phonemes.

In bilingual infants (those acquiring two languages simultaneously), contrasts must be both acquired and kept separate for the two languages, as contrasts present in one language may be allophonic in the other, or some of the phonemes of one language may be absent entirely in the other. The necessity of this separation has implications for the study of language acquisition and in particular simultaneous bilingualism, as it relates to the question of whether infants acquiring multiple languages have separate systems for doing so or whether there is a single system in place to handle multiple languages. (See Crosslinguistic influence.)

=== In L2 ===
Generally speaking those talented in learning new phonemic contrasts will retain at least some of their talent throughout their lives. In other words, someone who began becoming bilingual early in life will have similar aptitudes or difficulties that they would have if becoming bilingual later in life according to their individual capabilities. These individual abilities are not related to one's ability to process psychoacoustic information but are actually tied to parts of the brain that are specifically meant to process speech. These areas are where an individual's talent or lack thereof for pronouncing and distinguishing non-native phonemes comes from. Distinguishing between different phonemes in one's L2 can be a difficult task. For example, Dutch L2 English speakers were less capable of distinguishing between English /æ/ and /ɛ/ than Dutch-English bilinguals. Native speakers of Japanese hear English /l/ and English /r/ as a single sound whereas for English speakers there is a significant difference, distinguishing 'long' from 'wrong' and 'light' from 'right'.

Native English speaking L2 learners also have difficulty learning to hear the difference between sounds that are to them one and the same but to speakers of other languages are different phonemes. Take for instance the presence of aspirated and unaspirated alveolar stops that both appear frequently in English, oftentimes without the speaker knowing about the existence of two allophones instead of one. In other languages the difference between these two allophones is obvious and significant to the meaning of the word. There is also the example of Arabic, which has two sounds that an English speaker would hear and classify as a voiced glottal fricative, only one of which is actually a voiced glottal fricative. The other, written as ⟨ħ⟩, is a voiceless pharyngeal fricative. Distinguishing Hindi retroflex sounds can also be very difficult for English speakers.

== Contradicting contrasts for bilinguals ==
Bilingual speakers often find themselves in situations where a pair of phonemes are contrasted in one of their languages but not in the other. Babies are born with the ability to differentiate all phonemes, but as they age their ability to perceive phoneme boundaries lessens in ways specifically tailored to the language they hear as their input. In order to perceive a particular phonemic contrast, then, the pair must be contrastive in one's input. Generally, the earlier a language and/or phonemic contrast is learned, or is part of the input, the more sensitive a listener is to the phonemic boundaries of that pair and therefore better able to perceive the difference between the contrasting sounds. It is still possible, though, for late learners to acquire the ability to perceive contrasts that are not part of their first language.

Consider a study of Japanese-English speakers: Japanese speakers with minimal English exposure were asked to listen to the sounds /r/ and /l/ and discriminate between them. Because there is no contrast between these sounds in Japanese participants did not show an ability to make the discrimination. Japanese speakers who had frequent English exposure were able to discriminate /r/ and /l/ much more effectively, nearly at the rate of native speakers. Consider also a study of Spanish monolingual, Catalan monolingual, and Spanish-Catalan bilingual children: Catalan utilizes two vowels that are similar to, and partly correspond to, a single vowel in Spanish. This means that a speaker of Catalan needs to recognize /e/ and /ε/ as different, contrasting sounds, while a Spanish speaker only need recognize one phoneme, /e/ ([ɛ] is an allophone of /e/ in Spanish). Spanish-Catalan bilinguals, then, need to be able to recognize the contrast to accommodate their Catalan language. In one study, Catalan monolingual infants appeared to accurately discriminate between the two vowels while Spanish monolingual infants did not appear to make discriminations. Spanish-Catalan bilingual infants also did not appear to discriminate between the two vowels at 8 months of age.

Researchers suggest that input plays a large role in this discrepancy; perhaps the infants had not yet received enough input to have gained the ability to make the discrimination, or perhaps their dual input, Spanish and Catalan, both spoken with accents affected by the other as their parents were bilingual speakers, had made the contrast more difficult to detect. There was evidence, however, that by 12 months of age the bilingual infants were able to discriminate the sounds that were contrastive only in Catalan. Thus, it appears that bilinguals who have a particular phonemic contrast in one of their languages but not in the other are, in fact, able to gain the ability to make the discrimination between the contrasting phonemes of the language that has the pair, but that age and especially input are major factors in determining ability to make the discrimination.

== Diaphonemic contrast ==
An interlanguage phonemic contrast (diaphonemic contrast) is the contrast required to differentiate between two cognate forms coming from two compared varieties or dialects. Within languages that have particular phonemic contrasts there can be dialects that do not have the contrast or contrast differently (such as American South dialect pin/pen merger, where the two are not contrasted, but in other American dialects they are).

== Neutralization ==
Some speech phenomena may lead to the neutralization of phonemic contrasts, which means that a contrast that exists in the language is not utilized in order to differentiate words due to sound change. For example, due to final-obstruent devoicing, Russian бес ('demon', phonemically /bʲes/) and без ('without', phonemically /bʲez/) are pronounced identically in isolation as [bʲɛs].

== Bibliography ==
- Gimson, A.C. (2008), Cruttenden, A. (ed.), The Pronunciation of English (7 ed.), Hodder, ISBN 978-0-340-95877-3
