= Accidental gap =

Permissible word or form that does not exist

In linguistics, an accidental gap, also known as a gap, paradigm gap, accidental lexical gap, lexical gap, lacuna, or hole in the pattern, is a potential word, word sense, morpheme, or other form that does not exist in some language despite being theoretically permissible by the grammatical rules of that language. For example, a word that is pronounced as /zeɪk/ ZAYK is theoretically possible in English, as it would obey English phonological rules, but does not currently exist. Its absence is therefore an accidental gap, in the ontologic sense of the word accidental (that is, circumstantial rather than essential).

Accidental gaps differ from systematic gaps, where words or other forms do not exist due to the boundaries set by phonological, morphological, and other rules of the language. In English, a word pronounced /pfnk/ does not and cannot exist because it has no vowels and therefore does not obey the word-formation rules of English. This is a systematic, rather than accidental, gap.

Various types of accidental gaps exist. Phonological gaps are either words allowed by the phonological system of a language which do not actually exist, or sound contrasts missing from one paradigm of the phonological system itself. Morphological gaps are nonexistent words or word senses potentially allowed by the morphological system. A semantic gap refers to the nonexistence of a word or word sense to describe a difference in meaning seen in other sets of words within the language.

== Phonological gaps ==
Often words that are allowed in the phonological system of a language are absent. For example, in English the consonant cluster /spr/ is allowed at the beginning of words such as spread or spring and the syllable rime /ɪk/ occurs in words such as sick or flicker. Even so, there is no English word pronounced */sprɪk/. Even though this potential word is phonologically well-formed according to English phonotactics, it happens to not exist.

The term "phonological gap" is also used to refer to the absence of a phonemic contrast in part of the phonological system. For example, Thai has several sets of stop consonants that differ in voicing (whether or not the vocal cords vibrate) and aspiration (whether a puff of air is released). Yet the language has no voiced velar stop (/ɡ/). This lack of an expected distinction is commonly called a "hole in the pattern".

Thai stop consonants
plain voiceless	aspirated voiceless	voiced consonant
p	pʰ	b
t	tʰ	d
k	kʰ	/ɡ/

== Morphological gaps ==
A morphological gap is the absence of a word that could exist given the morphological rules of a language, including its affixes. For example, in English a deverbal noun can be formed by adding either the suffix -al or -(t)ion to certain verbs (typically words from Latin through Anglo-Norman French or Old French). Some verbs, such as recite have two related nouns, recital and recitation. However, in many cases there is only one such noun, as illustrated in the chart below. Although in principle the morphological rules of English allow for other nouns, those words happen to not exist.

verb	noun (-al)	noun (-ion)
recite	recital	recitation
propose	proposal	proposition
arrive	arrival	"arrivation"
refuse	refusal	"refusation"
describe	"describal"	description

Many potential words that could be made following morphological rules of a language do not enter the lexicon. Blocking, including homonymy blocking and synonymy blocking, stops some potential words. A homonym of an existing word may be blocked. For example, the word liver meaning "someone who lives" is only rarely used because the word liver (an internal organ) already exists. Likewise, a potential word can be blocked if it is a synonym of an existing word. An older, more common word blocks a potential synonym, known as token-blocking. For example, the word stealer ("someone who steals") is also rarely used, because the word thief already exists. Not only individual words, but entire word formation processes may be blocked. For example, the suffix -ness is used to form nouns from adjectives. This productive word-formation pattern blocks many potential nouns that could be formed with -ity. Nouns such as *calmity (a potential synonym of calmness) and *darkity (cf. darkness) are unused potential words. This is known as type-blocking.

A defective verb is a verb that lacks some grammatical conjugation. For example, several verbs in Russian do not have a first-person singular form in non-past tense. Although most verbs have such a form (e.g. vožu "I lead"), about 100 verbs in the second conjugation pattern (e.g. *derz'u "I talk rudely"; the asterisk indicates ungrammaticality) do not appear as first-person singular in the present-future tense. Morris Halle called this defective verb paradigm an example of an accidental gap.

The similar case of unpaired words occurs where one word is obsolete or rare while another word derived from it is more common. Examples include effable (whence ineffable), kempt (whence unkempt), or whelm (root of overwhelmed).

== Semantic gaps ==
A gap in semantics occurs when a particular meaning distinction visible elsewhere in the lexicon is absent. For example, English words describing family members generally show gender distinction. Yet the English word cousin can refer to either a male or female cousin. Similarly, while there are general terms for siblings and parents, there is no comparable common gender-neutral term for a parent's sibling, and traditionally none for a sibling's child. The separate words predicted on the basis of this semantic contrast are absent from the language, or at least from many speakers' dialects. It is possible to coin new ones (as happened with the word nibling), but whether those words gain widespread acceptance in general use, or remain neologistic and resisted outside particular registers, is a matter of prevailing usage in each era.

male	female	neutral
grandfather	grandmother	grandparent
father	mother	parent
son	daughter	child
brother	sister	sibling
uncle	aunt	pibling (but this coinage remains in limited use to date)
nephew	niece	nibling (but this coinage remains in limited use to date)
		cousin

== See also ==
- Idiom (language structure)
- Lacuna model
- Pseudoword, a unit that appears to be a word in a language but has no meaning in its lexicon
- Semantic gap in computer programming languages and natural language processing
- Sniglet, described as "any word that doesn't appear in the dictionary, but should"
