= Bound and free morphemes =

Types of morphemes

In linguistics, a bound morpheme is a morpheme (the elementary unit of morphosyntax) that can appear only as part of a larger expression, while a free morpheme (or unbound morpheme) is one that can stand alone. A bound morpheme is a type of bound form, and a free morpheme is a type of free form.

== Occurrence in isolation ==
A form is a free form if it can occur in isolation as a complete utterance, e.g. Johnny is running, or Johnny, or running (this can occur as the answer to a question such as What is he doing?). A form that cannot occur in isolation is a bound form, e.g. -y, is, and -ing (in Johnny is running). Non-occurrence in isolation is given as the primary criterion for boundness in most linguistics textbooks.

== Roots and affixes ==
Affixes are bound by definition. English language affixes are almost exclusively prefixes or suffixes: pre- in "precaution" and -ment in "shipment". Affixes may be inflectional, indicating how a certain word relates to other words in a larger phrase, or derivational, changing either the part of speech or the actual meaning of a word.

Most roots in English are free morphemes (e.g. examin- in examination, which can occur in isolation: examine), but others are bound (e.g. bio- in biology). Words like chairman that contain two free morphemes (chair and man) are referred to as compound words.

Cranberry morphemes are a special form of bound morpheme whose independent meaning has been displaced and serves only to distinguish one word from another, like in cranberry, in which the free morpheme berry is preceded by the bound morpheme cran-, meaning "crane" from the earlier name for the berry, "crane berry".

An empty morpheme is a special type of bound morpheme with no inherent meaning. Empty morphemes change the phonetics of a word but offer no semantic value to the word as a whole.

Examples:

Factual
Morpheme	Morpheme form	Morpheme meaning
fact-	Free morpheme	An idea or concept, usually proven true with supporting evidence, that has been socially accepted.
-u-	Bound morpheme	No meaning (empty morpheme)
-al	Bound morpheme	A type of, pertaining to, related to, etc. Creates an adjective form of the noun it supplements.

Sensual
Morpheme	Morpheme form	Morpheme meaning
sens(e-ø)-	Free morpheme	A body's perception of external stimulus.
-u-	Bound morpheme	No meaning (empty morpheme)
-al	Bound morpheme	A kind of, pertaining to, related to, etc. Creates an adjective form of the noun it supplements.

Speedometer
Morpheme	Morpheme form	Morpheme meaning
speed-	Free morpheme	The rate which an object covers distance
-o-	Bound morpheme	No meaning (empty morpheme)
-meter	Free morpheme	A measurement device

== Word formation ==
Words can be formed purely from bound morphemes, as in English permit, ultimately from Latin per "through" + mittō "I send", where per- and -mit are bound morphemes in English. However, they are often thought of as simply a single morpheme. Per is not a bound morpheme; a bound morpheme, by definition, cannot stand alone as a word. Per is a standalone word as seen in the sentence, "I go to the gym twice per day."

A similar example is given in Chinese; most of its morphemes are monosyllabic and identified with a Chinese character because of the largely morphosyllabic script, but disyllabic words exist that cannot be analyzed into independent morphemes, such as 蝴蝶 húdié 'butterfly'. Then, the individual syllables and corresponding characters are used only in that word, and while they can be interpreted as bound morphemes 蝴 hú- and 蝶 -dié, it is more commonly considered a single disyllabic morpheme. See polysyllabic Chinese morphemes for further discussion.

Linguists usually distinguish between productive and unproductive forms when speaking about morphemes. For example, the morpheme ten- in tenant was originally derived from the Latin word tenere, "to hold", and the same basic meaning is seen in such words as "tenable" and "intention." But as ten- is not used in English to form new words, most linguists would not consider it to be a morpheme at all.

== Analytic and synthetic languages ==
A language with a very low morpheme-to-word ratio is an isolating language. Because such a language uses few bound morphemes, it expresses most grammatical relationships by word order or helper words, so it is an analytic language.

In contrast, a language that uses a substantial number of bound morphemes to express grammatical relationships is a synthetic language.

== See also ==
- Fixed expression
- Fossil word
- Unpaired word
