= Cranberry morpheme =

Type of bound morpheme

In linguistic morphology a cranberry morpheme (also called unique morpheme or fossilized term) is a type of bound morpheme that cannot be assigned an independent meaning and grammatical function, but nonetheless serves to distinguish one word from another.

== Etymology ==
The eponymous archetypal example is the cran of cranberry. Unrelated to the homonym cran with the meaning "a case of herrings", this cran actually comes from crane (the bird), although the connection is not immediately evident. Similarly, mul (from Latin morus, the mulberry tree) exists only in mulberry. Phonetically, the first morpheme of raspberry also counts as a cranberry morpheme, even though the word "rasp" does occur by itself. Compare these with blackberry, which has two obvious unbound morphemes ("black" + "berry"), and to loganberry and boysenberry, both of which have first morphemes derived from surnames (James Harvey Logan and Rudolph Boysen, respectively).

== Examples ==
Other cranberry morphemes in English include:

- cob in cobweb, from the obsolete word coppe ("spider").
- Many elements in English toponyms, such as "-ing" ("Reading", "Dorking", "Washington") from an Old English term meaning "the people of..." or "belonging to..." (However, the "-ing" at the end of words such as "reading", the verb, is not a cranberry morpheme but rather an affixed morpheme.)
- dew in dewlap, assuming that the particle popularly associated with literal dew is folk etymology and not lost.
- Were in werewolf (literally, 'man-wolf')

== Emergence ==
Cranberry morphemes can arise in several ways:

- A dialectal word can become part of the standard language in a compound, but not in its root form: e.g. blatherskite ("one who talks nonsense"), as Scots has the word skite ("contemptible person").
- A word can become obsolete in its root form but remain current in a compound: e.g. lukewarm from Middle English luke ("tepid").
- A compound loanword may have a recognisable native cognate for one element but not the other: e.g. hinterland is from German hinter ("behind") + land ("land").
- A loanword may have one part misanalysed to a false cognate: e.g. a taffrail is a type of rail, but the word comes from Dutch tafereel ("carved panel").

== See also ==
- Appendix:Orphaned words
- Fossil word
- Unpaired word – words like "unkempt", "ruthless"
