= Lacuna (music) =

In music, a lacuna is an intentional extended passage in a musical work during which no notes are played. A lacuna acts as "negative music" to induce a state of serenity (or tension) in the listener through its contrast to "normal" music consisting of sounded notes. Though no notes are sounded during a lacuna, it is a purposeful musical passage used for a specific effect in the context of the overall work. Lacunae may be of any duration, as indicated by the composer.

Contrast this to a musical rest, which is of much shorter duration and a normal part of musical performance that serves to create rhythm and movement between notes. In general, rests do not call attention to themselves in the perception of the listener, whereas lacunae actively force the listener to experience silence as part of the overall performance.

In popular music, hidden tracks are often preceded by a lacuna. Radiohead's "Motion Picture Soundtrack", the last track on the album Kid A has an extended period of silence (the silence is nearly two minutes long) to augment the theme of the album, but is not precursor to a hidden track. Similarly, Boards of Canada's Geogaddi features a lacuna in its closing track, "Magic Window." It features almost two minutes of pure silence.

Some traditional Japanese music incorporates lacunae, the auditory equivalent of negative space, a visual aesthetic element particularly appreciated in Japanese culture.
