= Blocking (linguistics) =

Phenomenon in word formation

In linguistics, blocking is the morphological phenomenon in which a possible form for a word cannot surface because it is "blocked" by another form whose features are the most appropriate to the surface form's environment. More basically, it may also be construed as the "non-occurrence of one form due to the simple existence of another."

Word formation employs processes such as the plural marker in English s or es (e.g. dog and dogs or wish and wishes). This plural marker is not, however, acceptable on the word child (as in childs), because it is "blocked" by the presence of the competing form children, which in this case inherits features from an older morphological process.

Blocking may also prevent the formation of words with existing synonyms, particularly if the blocked form is morphologically complex and the existing synonym is morphologically simple, e.g. stealer which is blocked by the existing simple form thief.

One possible approach to blocking effects is that of distributed morphology, which asserts that semantic and syntactic features create slots or cells in which items can appear. Blocking happens when one cell is engaged by one form as opposed to another. Blocking has been explained along two primary dimensions: the size of the blocking object, and the existence of ungrammatical forms.

== History ==
Blocking was first described in the 5th or 4th century BC by the Indian grammarian Pāṇini, who stated that the more restricted of two competing rules would have precedence within a language system. During the 1960s, this insight was reformulated as the so-called "elsewhere principle", used in the language of several contemporary theories of grammar. Hermann Paul, a German linguist, wrangled with the idea, proposing an alternative theory that accounts for the crucial role of frequency in how blocking can be learned.
