= Lacuna model =

The lacuna model is a tool for unlocking culture differences or missing "gaps" in text (in the further meaning). The lacuna model was established as a theory by Jurij Sorokin and Irina Markovina (Russia), further developed by Astrid Ertelt-Vieth and Hartmut Schröder (Germany) and practical research tested in ethnopsycholinguistics (Igor Panasiuk 2000 and 2005), Russian studies (Vladimir Zhelvis 2002; Astrid Ertelt-Vieth 1987; 2005), American studies (Iosif Sternin and Marina Sternina 2001), Arabic studies (Sherine Elsayed 2005), Germanics studies (Elena Denisova-Schmidt 2005), Finnish studies (Pirkko Muikku-Werner 2005), literature studies (Irina Markovina 2005), foreign language acquisition (Natalia Turunen 2005), film studies (Hannah Sard 2005), journalism (B. Dellinger 1995; Myles Ludwig and Erika Grodzki 2005), translation studies (Susanne Becker 2005), cultural studies (Gwenn Gundula Hiller 2005), advertising research (Erika Grodzki 2003), human resource management, transcultural studies (Elena Denisova-Schmidt 2015), and cross-cultural and intercultural management (Olena Kryzhko 2015).

There are a few classifications of lacunas in existence. Astrid Ertelt-Vieth (2005) labels the first dimension (three major categories as: mental lacunas, activity lacunas and object lacunas) and the second dimension (axiological lacunas) of all lacunas.

- Mental lacunas are differences in cognitive and affective states.
- Lacunas of activity recognize different ways of processing information, talking, moving, as well as other activities.
- Object lacunas are the differences in objects, the human body, and the environment.
- Axiological lacunas are cultural based meaning/understanding of all mentioned above lacunas.

All lacunas could be confrontative, contrastive, implicit, explicit, relative, profound, absolute, relational and structural.

The Lacuna model is utilized to analyze cultural differences on a micro-level, i.e. it is looking at individual interactions and potential gaps caused by these interactions. It can be used both as stand-alone tool (e.g. Elena Denisova-Schmidt 2005, Gwenn Gundula Hiller 2005, Erika Grodzki 2003) or in combination with established frameworks in cross-cultural communication such as Hofstede's cultural dimensions theory, Trompenaars' model of national culture differences, Schwarz’ framework and the GLOBE Study (Olena Kryzhko 2015).

== Intercultural communication ==
Lacunas and gaps can often be observed in intercultural communication. In the beginning, the lacunian approach was used to analyze foreign texts and translations from one language to another. For example, English operates with two articles “the” and “a”, without differentiating between gender. In contrast, many other European languages, e.g. German, French, Italian, etc., have gender-specific articles. For example, for each “the” in German language, there are three gender specific articles “der”, “die” and “das”. Another very common example refers to nonexistence of concepts and terms. Thus, there is no word in English, German, French, Italian and many other languages for the Russian term “путевка“ (‘putevka’, which can be described as a voucher for a particular trip on specified route). The Chinese word “Guanxi”, which describes basic dynamics in the personal network of influence, also has no analogy in West-European languages.

In intercultural communication, lacunas address not only gaps in language structure and linguistics, but also non-verbal differences that result from different social structures and experiences. In this case, a lacuna can represent differences in behavior, living conditions and structures, and processes.

== See also ==
- Accidental gap
