= Abessive case =

Grammatical case

In linguistics, abessive (abbreviated abe or abess), caritive (abbreviated car) and privative (abbreviated priv) is the grammatical case expressing the lack or absence of the marked noun. In English, the corresponding function is expressed by the preposition without or by the suffix -less.

The name abessive is derived from abesse "to be away/absent", and is especially used in reference to Uralic languages. The name caritive is derived from Latin: carere "to lack", and is especially used in reference to Caucasian languages. The name privative is derived from Latin: privare "to deprive".

== In Afro-Asiatic languages ==
=== Somali ===
In the Somali language, the abessive case is marked by -la'. For example:

magac "name"
magacla' "nameless"
dhar "clothes"
dharla' "clothesless," i.e., naked

== In Australian languages ==
=== Martuthunira ===
In Martuthunira, the privative case is formed with either -wirriwa or -wirraa.

Parla-wirraa nganarna.
money-PRIV 1PL.EX
We've got no money.

== In Uralic languages ==
=== Finnish ===
In the Finnish language, the abessive case is marked by -tta for back vowels and -ttä for front vowels according to vowel harmony. For example:

raha "money"
rahatta "without money"

An equivalent construction exists using the word ilman and the partitive:

ilman rahaa "without money"

or, less commonly:

rahaa ilman "without money"

The abessive case of nouns is rarely used in writing and even less in speech, although some abessive forms are more common than their equivalent ilman forms:

tuloksetta "unsuccessfully, fruitlessly"
Itkin syyttä. "I cried for no reason."

The abessive is, however, commonly used in nominal forms of verbs (formed with the affix -ma- / -mä-):

puhu-ma-tta "without speaking"
osta-ma-tta "without buying"
välittä-mä-ttä "without caring"
Juna jäi tulematta. "The train didn't show up."

This form can often be replaced by using the negative form of the verb:

Juna ei tullut. "The train didn't show up."

It is possible to occasionally hear what is considered wrong usage of the abessive in Finnish, where the abessive and ilman forms are combined:

ilman rahatta

There is debate as to whether this is interference from Estonian.

=== Estonian ===
Estonian also uses the abessive, which is marked by -ta in both the singular and the plural:

(ilma) autota "without a car" (the preposition ilma "without" is optional)

Unlike in Finnish, the abessive is commonly used in both written and spoken Estonian.

The nominal forms of verbs are marked with the affix -ma- and the abessive marker -ta:

Rong jäi tulemata. "The train didn't show up."

Tallinn has a pair of bars that play on the use of the comitative and abessive, the Nimeta baar (the nameless bar) and the Nimega baar (the bar with a name).

=== Skolt Sami ===
The abessive marker for nouns in Skolt Sámi is -tää or -taa in both the singular and the plural:

Riâkkum veäʹrtää. "I cried for no reason."

The abessive-like non-finite verb form (converb) is -ǩâni or -kani:

Son vuõʹlji domoi mainsteǩâni mõʹnt leäi puättam. "He/she went home without saying why he/she had come."

Unlike Finnish, the Skolt Sámi abessive has no competing expression for lack of an item.

=== Inari Sami ===
The abessive marker for nouns in Inari Sámi is -táá. The corresponding non-finite verb form is -hánnáá, -hinnáá or -hennáá.

=== Other Sami languages ===
The abessive is not used productively in the Western Sámi languages, although it may occur as a cranberry morpheme.

=== Erzya ===
In Erzya-Mordvin, the abessive case suffix is -(v)ťeme or -(v)tomo, e.g. pevťeme "endless", kudovtomo "homeless" etc.

=== Hungarian ===
In Hungarian, the abessive case is marked by -talan for back vowels and -telen for front vowels according to vowel harmony. Sometimes, with certain roots, the suffix becomes -tlan or -tlen. For example:

pénz "money"
pénztelen "without money"
haza "home(land)"
hazátlan "(one) without a homeland"

There is also the postposition nélkül, which also means without, but is not meant for physical locations.

Cukor nélkül iszom a teát. "I drink tea without sugar."
Testvér nélkül éltem. "I lived without siblings."
Eljöttél Magyarországra a testvéred nélkül? "Did you come to Hungary without your sibling?"

== In Mongolic languages ==
=== Mongolian ===
In Mongolian, the privative suffix is -гүй (-güy). It is not universally considered to be a case, because the suffix does not conform to vowel harmony or undergo any stem-dependent orthographical variation. However, its grammatical function is the precise inverse of the comitative case, and the two form a pair of complementary case forms.

== See also ==
- Essive case
- Inessive case
