= Egressive case =

Grammatical case

The egressive case (abbreviated egre) marks the beginning of a movement from an approximate location or a moment in time.

This case is used in Udmurt, Veps, Komi-Zyrian, and Komi-Permiak languages (all belonging to Uralic languages).

== Example ==
=== Udmurt ===
гурт ысeн гуртысeн
{(a) village} {starting from} {starting from a village}
