= Terminative case =

Grammatical case

In grammar, the terminative or terminalis case (abbreviated TERM) is a case specifying a limit in space and time and also to convey the goal or target of an action.

== Assamese ==
In the Assamese language, the terminative case is indicated by the suffix -(অ)লৈকে -(o)loike:

আজিৰ পৰা পৰহিলৈকে
azir pora porohiloike
'from today up to the-day-after-tomorrow'

মৰিগাঁৱৰ পৰা হোজাইলৈকে
morigaor pora hüzailoike
'From Morigaon up to Hojai.'

নৈৰ ইপাৰৰ পৰা সিপাৰলৈকে
noir iparor pora xiparoloike
'From this bank up to that bank of the river'

== Bashkir ==
In the Bashkir language, the terminative case is indicated by the suffix -ğasa/-gäsä/-qasa/-käsä:

киске 12-нән таңғы етегәсә
kiske 12-nän tañğï yetegäsä
'from 12 pm up to 7 am'

Был аҙнала 32 градусҡаса эҫетәсәк.
Bïl aðnala 32 gradusqasa eśetäsäk
'This week, it will get hot up to 32 degrees (celsius).'

However, postpositions тиклем (tiklem), хәтлем (xätlem), ҡәҙәр (qäðär) 'till, up to' are more frequently used in Bashkir to convey this meaning.

== Classical Hebrew ==
T.J. Meek has argued that "the so-called locative hē" in Classical Hebrew "is terminative only and should be renamed terminative hē."

== Estonian ==
In the Estonian language, the terminative case is indicated by the '-ni' suffix:

- jõeni: 'to the river'/'as far as the river'
- kella kuueni: 'until six o'clock'

== Hungarian ==
The Hungarian language uses the '-ig' suffix.

- a házig: 'as far as the house'
- hat óráig/hatig: 'until six o'clock'

If used for time, it can also show how long the action lasted.

- hat óráig: 'for six hours'/'six hours long'
- száz évig: 'for a hundred years'

It is not always clear whether the thing in terminative case belongs to the interval in question or not.

- A koncertig maradtam.: 'I stayed until the concert (ended or started?)' Here it is more likely that the person only stayed there until the concert began.
- Mondj egy számot 1-től 10-ig!: 'Say a number from 1 to (until) 10.' However here 10 can be said as well.

The corresponding question word is meddig?, which is simply the question word mi? ('what?') in terminative case.

== Sumerian ==
In Sumerian, the terminative case -še not only was used to indicate end-points in space or time but also end-points of an action itself such as its target or goal. In this latter role, it functioned much like an accusative case.

== Finnish ==
The use of the postposition asti (or synonymously saakka) with the illative (or allative or sublative) case in Finnish very closely corresponds to the terminative. These same postpositions with the elative (or ablative) case also express the opposite of a terminative: a limit in time or space of origination or initiation.

The old Finnish terminative -ni is no longer productive, but it appears in the Kalevala: nominative se "it, that" ~ terminative sini "up to where" = modern siihen asti, and nominative kuka "who, what (poetic)" ~ terminative kuni "up to where" = modern kuhun asti. Also, the established phrase kaikki tyynni "every, until completion" contains the terminative tyynni, being derived from an older form kaikki tyvennik "every, up to its base", where tyvi is "foot, base".

== Japanese ==
The Japanese particle まで (made) acts like a terminative case.

== See also ==
- Cessative aspect
- Desiderative mood
- List of grammatical cases
