= Gender differences in Japanese =

Gender expression in the Japanese language

The Japanese language has some words and some grammatical constructions associated with men or boys, while others are associated with women or girls. Such differences are sometimes called "gendered language". In Japanese, speech patterns associated with women are referred to as onna kotoba (女言葉; "women's words") or joseigo (女性語; "women's language"), and those associated with men are referred to as danseigo (男性語; "men's language").

In general, the words and speech patterns associated with men are perceived as rough, vulgar, or abrupt, while those associated with women are considered more polite, more deferential, or "softer". Some linguists consider the description of "rough–soft continuum" more accurate than the description of "male–female continuum". For example, Eleanor Harz Jorden in Japanese: The Spoken Language refers to the styles as "blunt/gentle", rather than male/female.

There are no gender differences in written Japanese (except in quoted speech), and almost no differences in polite speech (teineigo).

== Conventional women's speech ==
The word onnarashii (女らしい), which is usually translated as "ladylike" or "feminine," refers to the behaviour expected of a typical Japanese woman in a customary scene. As well as behaving in particular ways, being onnarashii means conforming to particular styles of speech. Some of the features of women's speech include speaking in a higher register, using more polite forms and using polite speech or honorifics in more situations, and referring to themselves and those whom they address more formally.

Some linguistic features commonly associated with women include: omission of the copula da, the use of first person pronouns such as watashi or atashi among others, use of feminine sentence-final particles such as wa, na no, kashira, and mashō, and the more frequent use of the honorific prefixes o- and go-.

Actual language used by Japanese-speaking women differs from these ideals. Such onnarashii speech is a social norm that institutions such as education and media encourage women to adopt. Similarly, these forms may be prescribed for women learners by Japanese textbooks and other materials. There are, however, various deviations from these norms in conversation.

Although Japanese women may not follow the gender norm in speech, some linguistic studies indicate that Japanese women tend to use more honorific language than men do, which reinforces the idea of onnarashii and conventional gender roles.

=== Sentence-final particles ===
One of the sentence-final particles often found in women's speech in Japan is wa. It is generally used in a conversation in which the speaker and addressee are close to each other. On the other hand, it is inappropriate to use wa in an official relationship such as business relationships or formal interviews. The wa found in women's speech has a rising intonation, while the wa with falling intonation can be used by male speakers in modern standard colloquial Japanese. However, both serve the same function of conveying a sense of insistence on the part of the speaker. One possible explanation of the femininity associated with wa is the high and gentle intonation which appropriates the insistence to the better judgement of the addressee. However, other researchers argue that the rising and high intonation are used to show an interest in the conversation and therefore help to continue it because falling intonation is often associated with ending a conversation.

== Conventional men's speech ==
Just as there are modes of speaking and behaviour that have sometimes been considered intrinsically feminine, there are also those that are considered otokorashii (男らしい; "manly" or "masculine"). Based on men's reports of their own speech, as well as prescriptive advice for language use, men's language is thought of as using fewer polite forms, distinct pronouns and sentence-final particles, and some reduced vowels.

Some words associated with men's speech include: the informal da in place of the copula desu, first person pronouns such as ore and boku, and sentence-final particles such as yo, ze, zo, and kana. Masculine speech also features less frequent use of honorific prefixes and fewer aizuchi response tokens.

Research on Japanese men's speech shows greater use of "neutral" forms, forms not strongly associated with masculine or feminine speech, than is seen in Japanese women's speech.

Some studies of conversation between Japanese men and women show neither gender taking a more dominant position in interaction. Men, however, tend to show a "self-oriented conversation style", telling stories and expressing their expertise on topics being discussed more than is typical of women in these studies.

=== Sentence-final particles ===
Sentence-final particles that are generally considered within the realm of male speech are zo, ze and sa. They are used to impart information that belongs to the speaker's sphere to an addressee. The perceived masculinity of these particles comes from the stronger level of assertive force that they have in comparison to particles like wa or no. Zo is the most imposing particle, stating a proposition with an authoritative tone to an addressee of lower status. It can mostly be observed among intimate male friends and within the senior-junior social realm. Ze is viewed as a milder version of zo and employed by the speaker if they have a buddy-like relationship with the addressee. Sa has a very similar status to ze but the pragmatic/semantic force of it is not as clear as the other two. Attributes contributed to sa are "vigorous and ego-assertive" while others argue that sa is used to state something "obvious" and "matter-of course". Generally sa implies a sense of resignation or acceptance of a given situation on the part of the speaker.

Work by Misao Okada shows that so-called male speech is not just used in Japanese for male identity; imperatives can be utilised in order to make the hearer perform a fast movement immediately, for instance, in a sport session. Moreover, imperatives and particles with a traditional male connotation (such as zo) can be used to stress criticism. In these contexts imperatives and other directives are part of the vocal, kinetic and material environment they occur in, making male speech dependent on a specific situation without being linked to gender. These examples could demonstrate that the label "men's speech" (danseigo) is much more diverse than originally considered.

== In modern society ==
Since the late twentieth century observers have noted that individual Japanese men and women do not necessarily speak in the ways attributed to their gender. Scholars have described considerable variation within each gender; some individuals use these characteristics of gendered speech, while others do not. Upper-class women who did not conform to conventional expectations of gendered speech were sometimes criticized for failing to maintain so-called "traditional Japanese culture".

=== In the LGBT community ===
Another recent phenomenon influencing gender norms in speech is the popularity of okama (おかま) entertainers, typically men who enact very feminine speech, dress, and other gender markers. The word okama originally referred to feminine male homosexuals, but its usage has expanded to refer to masculine gay men, male cross-dressers, and trans women, among other uses. Entertainers who identify as okama sometimes use a form of speech called onē kotoba (オネエ言葉), literally "older sister speech" but with the word onē ("older sister") used to denote an effeminate man, a speaking style that combines the formal aspects of women's speech described above with blunt or crude words and topics. For example:

- あたし 今 カレー 食ったら 下痢 だ わ。

Atashi ima karē kuttara geri da wa.
"If I ate curry now, I'd get diarrhea."

The pronoun atashi and the sentence-final da wa is typical of women's speech, while the verb kuttara is typical of men's speech and the topic itself is very blunt.

Hideko Abe suggests that onē kotoba originated during the Shōwa era among sex workers known as danshō (男娼), literally "male prostitutes", who adopted feminine speech, wore women's clothing, and often referred to themselves as women. Celebrities and tarento who use onē kotoba include Akihiro Miwa, Shōgo Kariyazaki, IKKO, Kaba-chan, and the twin brothers Osugi and Peeco. In one instance, two lesbian users of onē kotoba were interviewed by Claire Maree, who reported that they were characterized as onna-onē (女オネエ), or "female queens" by their peers. Maree argues that they were attempting to avoid both heteronormative femininity and stereotypes of lesbians as masculine.

The word onabe (おなべ), although it originally referred to masculine lesbians and female cross-dressers, has evolved to include trans men. Onabe hosts interviewed in the 1995 documentary Shinjuku Boys use a variety of gendered markers in their speech that are traditionally considered feminine or masculine. One speaker exclusively uses the reflexive pronoun jibun (自分) as a gender-neutral first-person pronoun but also utilizes more feminine ending particles like na no, while another uses the masculine first-person pronoun ore but does not identify as a man or a woman. Abe further notes that two onabe included in a round table discussion in the bisexual and lesbian magazine Anise used jibun as a first-person pronoun, while trans men preferred boku.

== See also ==
- Japanese pronouns
- Gender-neutral pronoun: Japanese
- Language and gender
- Nyōbō kotoba – Words used by Japanese women in the Muromachi period
- Otokonoko – Japanese men who cross-dress as women
- Burikko – Japanese term for girls or women who act deliberately cute or innocent, can include changes to speech
