= Japanese grammar =

Grammar of the Japanese language

Japanese is an agglutinative, synthetic, mora-timed language with simple phonotactics, a pure vowel system, phonemic vowel and consonant length, and a lexically significant pitch-accent. Word order is normally subject–object–verb with particles marking the grammatical function of words, and sentence structure is topic–comment. Its phrases are exclusively head-final and compound sentences are exclusively left-branching. (Note: In contrast, Romance languages such as Spanish are strongly right-branching, and Germanic languages such as English are weakly right-branching.) Sentence-final particles are used to add emotional or emphatic impact, or make questions. Nouns have no grammatical number or gender, and there are no articles. Verbs are conjugated, primarily for tense and voice, but not person. Japanese adjectives are also conjugated. Japanese has a complex system of honorifics with verb forms and vocabulary to indicate the relative status of the speaker, the listener, and persons mentioned.

In language typology, it has many features different from most European languages.

== Distinctive aspects of modern Japanese sentence structure ==
=== Word order: head-final and left-branching ===
The modern theory of constituent order ("word order"), usually attributed to Joseph Harold Greenberg, identifies several kinds of phrases. Each one has a head and possibly a modifier. The head of a phrase either precedes its modifier (head-initial) or follows it (head-final). Some of these phrase types, with the head marked in boldface, are:

- genitive phrase, i.e., noun modified by another noun ("the **cover** of the book", "the book's **cover**");
- noun governed by an adposition ("**on** the table", "**underneath** the table");
- comparison ("[X is] **bigger** than Y", i.e., "compared to Y, X is **big**").
- noun modified by an adjective ("black **cat**").

Some languages are inconsistent in constituent order, having a mixture of head-initial phrase types and head-final phrase types. Looking at the preceding list, English for example is mostly head-initial, but nouns follow the adjectives which modify them. Moreover, genitive phrases can be either head-initial or head-final in English. By contrast, the Japanese language is consistently head-final:

- genitive phrase:

猫 の 色
neko no iro
cat GEN color
"the cat's (neko no) color (iro)"

- noun governed by an adposition:

日本 に
nihon ni
Japan in
"in Japan"

- comparison:

Y より 大きい
Y yori ookii
Y‍ than big
"bigger than Y"

- noun modified by an adjective:

黒い 猫
kuroi neko
black cat

Head-finality in Japanese sentence structure carries over to the building of sentences using other sentences. In sentences that have other sentences as constituents, the subordinated sentences (relative clauses, for example), always precede what they refer to, since they are modifiers and what they modify has the syntactic status of phrasal head. Translating the phrase "the man who was walking down the street" into Japanese word order would be "street down walking was man". (Note: Note that Japanese has no articles, and the different word order obviates any need for the relative pronoun who.)

Head-finality prevails also when sentences are coordinated instead of subordinated. In the world's languages, it is common to avoid repetition between coordinated clauses by optionally deleting a constituent common to the two parts, as in "Bob bought his mother some flowers and his father a tie", where the second bought is omitted. In Japanese, such "gapping" must proceed in the reverse order: "Bob mother for some flowers and father for tie bought". The reason for this is that in Japanese, sentences (other than occasional inverted sentences or sentences containing afterthoughts) always end in a verb (or other predicative words like adjectival verbs, adjectival nouns, auxiliary verbs)—the only exceptions being a few sentence-ending particles such as ka, ne, and yo. The particle ka turns a statement into a question, while the others express the speaker's attitude towards the statement.

=== Word class system ===
Japanese has five major lexical word classes:

- nouns (名詞, meishi)
- verbal nouns (correspond to English gerunds like 'studying', 'jumping', which denote activities)
- adjectival nouns (形容動詞, keiyō dōshi) (names vary, also called na-adjectives or "nominal adjectives")
- verbs (動詞, dōshi)
- adjectives (形容詞, keiyōshi) (so-called i-adjectives)

More broadly, there are two classes: uninflectable (nouns, including verbal nouns and adjectival nouns) and inflectable (verbs, with adjectives as defective verbs). To be precise, a verbal noun is simply a noun to which the light verb suru (する, "do") can be appended, while an adjectival noun is like a noun but uses -na (〜な) instead of -no (〜の) when acting attributively. Adjectives (i-adjectives) inflect identically to the negative form of verbs, which end in na-i (ない). Compare tabe-na-i (食べない, don't eat) → tabe-na-katta (食べなかった, didn't eat) and atsu-i (熱い, is hot) → atsu-katta (熱かった, was hot).

Some scholars, such as Eleanor Harz Jorden, refer to adjectives instead as adjectivals, since they are grammatically distinct from adjectives: they can predicate a sentence. That is, atsui (熱い) is glossed as "hot" when modifying a noun phrase, as in atsui gohan (熱いご飯, hot food), but as "is hot" when predicating, as in gohan wa atsui (ご飯は熱い, [the] food is hot).

==== Open and closed classes ====
The two inflected classes, verb and adjective, are historically considered closed classes, meaning they do not readily gain new members—but see the following paragraphs. Instead, new and borrowed verbs and adjectives are typically conjugated periphrastically as verbal noun + suru (e.g. benkyō suru (勉強する, do studying; study)) and adjectival noun + na. This differs from Indo-European languages, where verbs and adjectives are open classes, though analogous "do" constructions exist, including English "do a favor", "do the twist" or French "faire un footing" (do a "footing", go for a jog), and periphrastic constructions are common for other senses, like "try climbing" (verbal noun) or "try parkour" (noun). Other languages where verbs are a closed class include Basque: very few Basque verbs (albeits very common ones) have synthetic conjugation, all the others are only formed periphrastically. Conversely, pronouns are closed classes in Western languages but open classes in Japanese and some other East Asian languages.

In a few cases historically, and much more commonly recently, new verbs are created by appending the suffix -ru (〜る) to a noun or using it to replace the end of a word. This is most often, but not exclusively, done with borrowed words, and results in a word written in a mixture of katakana (stem) and hiragana (inflectional ending), which is otherwise very rare. This is typically casual, with the most well-established example being sabo-ru (サボる, skip class; play hooky) (circa 1920), from sabotāju (サボタージュ, sabotage), with other common examples including memo-ru (メモる, write a memo), from memo (メモ), and misu-ru (ミスる, make a mistake) from misu (ミス, mistake). In cases where the borrowed word already ends with or even contains a ru (ル) or ri (リ), this may be rebracketed as a verb ending and changed to a ru (る), as in gugu-ru (ググる, to google), from gūguru (グーグル, Google); dabu-ru (ダブる, to double), from daburu (ダブル, double); and fabo-ru (ファボる, to favorite (e.g. a tweet)), from faboriito (ファボリート, favorite). New verbs coined in this fashion are uniformly group 1 verbs and, at least in the Tokyo accent, consistently are stressed immediately before the final る.

New adjectives are extremely rare; one example is kiiro-i (黄色い, yellow), from adjectival noun kiiro (黄色), and a more casual recent example is kimo-i (きもい, gross), by contraction of kimochi waru-i (気持ち悪い, bad-feeling). By contrast, in Old Japanese -shiki (〜しき) adjectives (precursors of present i-adjectives ending in -shi-i (〜しい), formerly a different word class) were open, as reflected in words like ita-ita-shi-i (痛々しい, pitiful), from the adjective ita-i (痛い, painful, hurt), and kō-gō-shi-i (神々しい, heavenly, sublime), from the noun kami (神, god) (with sound change). Japanese adjectives are unusual in being closed class but quite numerous – about 700 adjectives – while most languages with closed class adjectives have very few. Some believe this is due to a grammatical change of inflection from an aspect system to a tense system, with adjectives predating the change.

The conjugation of i-adjectives has similarities to the conjugation of verbs, unlike Western languages where inflection of adjectives, where it exists, is more likely to have similarities to the declension of nouns. Verbs and adjectives being closely related is unusual from the perspective of English, but is a common case across languages generally, and one may consider Japanese adjectives as a kind of stative verb.

Japanese vocabulary has a large layer of Chinese loanwords, including those borrowed in ancient times as well as modern Sino-Japanese coinages (wasei kango), yet virtually none of them are verbs or "i-adjectives" – they are all nouns, of which some are verbal nouns (suru) and some are adjectival nouns (na). In addition to the basic verbal noun + suru form, verbal nouns with a single-character root often experienced sound changes, such as -suru (〜する) → -zuru (〜ずる) (rendaku) → -jiru (〜じる), as in kin-jiru (禁じる, forbid), and some cases where the stem underwent sound change, as in tassuru (達する, reach), from tatsu (達).

Verbal nouns are uncontroversially nouns, having only minor syntactic differences to distinguish them from pure nouns like 'mountain'. There are some minor distinctions within verbal nouns, most notably that some primarily conjugate as -o suru (〜をする) (with a particle), more like nouns, while others primarily conjugate as -suru (〜する), and others are common either way. For example, keiken o suru (経験をする, to experience) is much more common than keiken suru (経験する), while kanben suru (勘弁する, to pardon) is much more common than kanben o suru (勘弁をする). Adjectival nouns have more syntactic differences versus pure nouns, and traditionally were considered more separate, but they, too, are ultimately a subcategory of nouns.

There are a few minor word classes that are related to adjectival nouns, namely the taru adjectives and naru adjectives. Of these, naru adjectives are fossils of earlier forms of na adjectives (the nari adjectives of Old Japanese), and are typically classed separately, while taru adjectives are a parallel class (formerly tari adjectives in Late Old Japanese), but are typically classed with na adjectives.

==== Different classifications ====
The first structured description of the Japanese parts of speech (品詞, hinshi) was in Gogaku Shinsho (語學新書), an 1831 grammar by Tsurumine Shigenobu. It was based on earlier Dutch grammars such as Shizuki Tadao's Oranda Shihin Kō (和蘭詞品考; lit. 'Study of the Dutch Parts of Speech', 1798) and Rango Kyūhin Shū (蘭語九品集; lit. 'Compilation of the Nine Dutch Parts of Speech', date unknown). The words hinshi and shihin also came about from these early late-Edo and early-Meiji grammars. Since then, there have been multiple conflicting classifications of the parts of speech of Japanese.

Grammarian	Year	Count	Parts of speech (詞品／品詞, shihin / hinshi)															
Tsurumine Shigenobu	1831	nine parts of speech (九品, kyūhin)	nouns (實體言／ヰコトバ, jittaigen / ikotoba)		pronouns (代名言／カヘコトバ, daimeigen / kaekotoba)	adjectives (虚體言／ツキコトバ, kyotaigen / tsukikotoba)		verbs (活用言／ハタラキコトバ, katsuyōgen / hatarakikotoba)					postpositions (指示言／サシコトバ, shijigen / sashikotoba)	adverbs (形容言／サマコトバ, keiyōgen / samakotoba)	conjunctions (接續言／ツヾケコトバ, setsuzokugen / tsuzukekotoba)	interjections (感動言／ナゲキコトバ, kandōgen / nagekikotoba)	attributives (連體言／ツヾキコトバ, rentaigen / tsuzukikotoba)	
Ministry of Education, Science, Sports and Culture	1872	eight parts of speech	nouns (名(ナ)詞(コトバ), nakotoba)		pronouns (代詞, kawarikotoba)	adjectives (樣詞, samakotoba)		verbs (働詞, hatarakikotoba)		particles (後詞, atokotoba)				adverbs (副詞, soekotoba)	conjunctions (接詞, tsugikotoba)	interjections (歎詞, nagekikotoba)		
Tanaka Yoshikado	1874	seven parts of speech (七品詞, shichihinshi)	nouns (名詞／ナコトバ, meishi / nakotoba)		pronouns (代名詞／カハリコトバ, daimeishi / kawarikotoba)	adjectives (形容詞／サマコトバ, keiyōshi / samakotoba)		verbs (動詞／ハタラキコトバ, dōshi / hatarakikotoba)						adverbs (副詞／ソヘコトバ, fukushi / soekotoba)	conjunctions (接續詞／ツギコトバ, setsuzokushi / tsugikotoba)	interjections (感詞／ナゲキコトバ, kanshi / nagekikotoba)		
Tanaka Yoshikado	1877	eight parts of speech (八品詞, happinshi (Note: Without explicit furigana in this particular source, this pronunciation was inferred from pronunciations in other sources that treated hinshi as part of a sequence of numeral+counter+noun, in which case hin (品) was a counter for the noun shi (詞). Examples included jippinshi (十(じつ)品(ぴん)詞(し)) and happinshi (八(はつ)品(ぴん)詞(し)), happinshi (八(ハツ)品(ピン)詞(シ)), happinshi (八(はつ)品(ぴん)詞(し)), ハツピンシ（八品詞）, ハッピンシ（八品詞）. Current dictionaries treat hinshi as a full-fledged noun, hence hachihinshi (八(はち)品(ひん)詞(し)).))	nouns (名詞／ナコトバ, meishi / nakotoba)		pronouns (代名詞／カハリコトバ, daimeishi / kawarikotoba)	adjectives (形容詞／サマコトバ, keiyōshi / samakotoba)		verbs (動詞／ハタラキコトバ, dōshi / hatarakikotoba)		particles (後詞／アトコトバ, kōshi / atokotoba)				adverbs (副詞／ソヘコトバ, fukushi / soekotoba)	conjunctions (接續詞／ツギコトバ, setsuzokushi / tsugikotoba)	interjections (感詞／ナゲキコトバ, kanshi / nagekikotoba)		
Nakane Kiyoshi	1876	eight parts of speech (八品詞, happinshi)	nouns (名詞, meishi)		pronouns (代名詞, daimeishi)	adjectives (形容詞, keiyōshi)		verbs (動詞, dōshi)		particles (後詞, kōshi)				adverbs (副詞, fukushi)	conjunctions (接續詞, setsuzokushi)	interjections (感歎詞, kantanshi)		
Yasuda Keisai	1877	eight parts of speech (八品／八品詞, happin / happinshi)	nouns (名詞／ナコトバ, meishi / nakotoba)		pronouns (代名詞／カハリコトバ, daimeishi / kawarikotoba)	adjectives (形容詞／サマコトバ, keiyōshi / samakotoba)		verbs (動詞／ハタラキコトバ, dōshi / hatarakikotoba)		particles (後詞／アトコトバ, kōshi / atokotoba)				adverbs (副詞／ソヘコトバ, fukushi / soekotoba)	conjunctions (接續詞／ツギコトバ, setsuzokushi / tsugikotoba)	interjections (歎息詞／ナゲキコトバ, tansokushi / nagekikotoba)		
Hori Hidenari	1877	three parts of speech	nouns (言(コト), koto) (Note: Equivalent to taigen (体言) in other analyses.)			verbs (詞(コトバ), kotoba) (Note: Equivalent to yōgen (用言) in other analyses.)			auxiliaries (辭(テニヲハ), tenioha)									
Nakajima Misao	1879	eight parts of speech (八品詞, happinshi)	nouns (名詞, meishi)		pronouns (代名詞, daimeishi)	adjectives (形容詞, keiyōshi)		verbs (動詞, dōshi)					postpositions (後置詞, kōchishi)	adverbs (副詞, fukushi)	conjunctions (接續詞, setsuzokushi)	interjections (感詞, kanshi)		
Ōya Tōru	1880	seven parts of speech (七種, shichishu)	nouns (體言／名詞, taigen / meishi)		pronouns (代名言, daimeigen)	adjectives (形狀言／形容詞, keijōgen / keiyōshi)		verbs (用言／働詞, yōgen / dōshi)	auxiliaries (助辭／弖爾波, joji / teniha)					adverbs (接續言, setsuzokugen)		interjections (感動言, kandōgen)		
Ōya Tōru	1899	seven parts of speech	nouns (名詞, meishi)		pronouns (代名詞, daimeishi)	adjectives (形容詞, keiyōshi)		verbs (動詞, dōshi)	auxiliaries (助辭, joji)					adverbs (副詞, fukushi)	conjunctions (接續詞, setsuzokushi)	interjections (感動詞, kandōshi)		
Basil Hall Chamberlain	1887	nine parts of speech (九品の詞, kyūhin no kotoba)	nouns (實名詞, jitsumeishi)	numerals (數詞, sūshi)	pronouns (代名詞, daimeishi)	adjectives (形容詞, keiyōshi)		verbs (働詞, dōshi)		particles (關係詞／後置詞, kankeishi / kōchishi)				adverbs (副詞, fukushi)	conjunctions (接續詞, setsuzokushi)	interjections (間投詞, kantōshi)		
Ōtsuki Fumihiko	1889	eight parts of speech (八品詞, happinshi)	nouns (名(メイ)詞(シ), meishi)			adjectives (形(ケイ)容(ヨウ)詞(シ), keiyōshi)		verbs (動(ドウ)詞(シ), dōshi)	auxiliaries (助(ジヨ)動(ドウ)詞(シ), jodōshi)	particles (天(テ)爾(ニ)遠(ヲ)波(ハ), tenioha)				adverbs (副(フク)詞(シ), fukushi)	conjunctions (接(セツ)續(ゾク)詞(シ), setsuzokushi)	interjections (感(カン)動(ドウ)詞(シ), kandōshi)		
Ōtsuki Fumihiko	1897	eight parts of speech (八品詞, happinshi)	nouns (名(メイ)詞(シ), meishi)			adjectives (形(ケイ)容(ヨウ)詞(シ), keiyōshi)		verbs (動(ドウ)詞(シ), dōshi)	auxiliaries (助(ジヨ)動(ドウ)詞(シ), jodōshi)	particles (弖(テ)爾(ニ)乎(ヲ)波(ハ), tenioha)				adverbs (副(フク)詞(シ), fukushi)	conjunctions (接(セツ)續(ゾク)詞(シ), setsuzokushi)	interjections (感(カン)動(ドウ)詞(シ), kandōshi)		
Ochiai Naobumi	1890	nine parts of speech	nouns (名詞, meishi)		pronouns (代名詞, daimeishi)	adjectives (形狀言, keijōgen)		verbs (作用言, sayōgen)	auxiliaries (動助辭, dōjoji)	particles (靜助辭, seijoji)				adverbs (副詞, fukushi)	conjunctions (接續詞, setsuzokushi)	interjections (歎詞, tanshi)		
Ochiai Naobumi	1893	nine parts of speech	nouns (名詞, meishi)		pronouns (代名詞, daimeishi)	adjectives (形容詞, keiyōshi)		verbs (作用詞, sayōshi)	auxiliaries (動辭／動助辭, dōji / dōjoji)	particles (體辭, taiji)				adverbs (副詞, fukushi)	conjunctions (接續詞, setsuzokushi)	interjections (歎詞, tanshi)		
Ochiai Naobumi	1895	eleven parts of speech (十一品詞, jūippinshi)	nouns (名詞, meishi)	numerals (數詞, sūshi)	pronouns (代名詞, daimeishi)	adjectives (形容詞／形狀言, keiyōshi / keijōgen)		verbs (動詞／作用言, dōshi / sayōgen)	auxiliaries (助動詞／動助辭, jodōshi / dōjoji)	particles (助辭／靜助辭／弖爾乎波, joji / seijoji / tenioha)	affixes (助語, jogyo)			adverbs (副詞, fukushi)	conjunctions (接續詞, setsuzokushi)	interjections (感動詞／間投詞／嘆詞／感嘆詞, kandōshi / kantōshi / tanshi / kantanshi)		
Ochiai Naobumi	1897	eleven parts of speech (十一品詞, jūippinshi)	nouns (名詞, meishi)	numerals (數詞, sūshi)	pronouns (代名詞, daimeishi)	adjectives (形容詞, keiyōshi)		verbs (動詞, dōshi)	verbs (助動詞, jodōshi)	particles (助辭, joji)	affixes (助語, jogyo)			adverbs (副詞, fukushi)	conjunctions (接續詞, setsuzokushi)	interjections (感歎詞, kantanshi)		
Ochiai Naobumi	1915	twelve parts of speech	nouns (名詞, meishi)	numerals (數詞, sūshi)	pronouns (代名詞, daimeishi)	adjectives (形容詞, keiyōshi)		verbs (動詞, dōshi)	verbs (助動詞, jodōshi)	particles (助辭, joji)	prefixes (接頭語, settōgo)	suffixes (接尾語, setsubigo)		adverbs (副詞, fukushi)	conjunctions (接續詞, setsuzokushi)	interjections (感歎詞, kantanshi)		
Tejima Haruji	1890	seven parts of speech (七種, shichishu)	nouns (名言, meigen)		pronouns (代名言, daimeigen)	verbs (用言, yōgen)				particles (後置言, kōchigen)				adverbs (副言, fukugen)	conjunctions (接續言, setsuzokugen)	interjections (感歎言, kantangen)		
Tejima Haruji	1899	eight parts of speech (八種, hasshu)	nouns (名詞, meishi)		pronouns (代名詞, daimeishi)	verbs (動詞, dōshi)				particles (後置詞, kōchishi)				adverbs (副詞, fukushi)	conjunctions (接續詞, setsuzokushi)	interjections (感歎詞, kantanshi)	attributives (形容詞, keiyōshi)	
Takada Utarō	1899	nine parts of speech (九種の詞, kyūshu no kotoba)	nouns (名詞, meishi)		pronouns (代名詞, daimeishi)	verbs (形狀言／形容動詞, keijōgen / keiyō dōshi)		verbs (作用言／作用動詞, sayōgen / sayō dōshi)	auxiliaries (助用辭, joyōji)	particles (助體辭／助躰辭, jotaiji)				adverbs (副詞, fukushi)	conjunctions (接續詞, setsuzokushi)	interjections (感歎詞, kantanshi)		
Ōwada Takeki	1891	seven parts of speech (七品詞, shichihinshi)	nouns (名詞, meishi)			adjectives (形容詞, keiyōshi)		verbs (動詞, dōshi)		particles (後詞, kōshi)				adverbs (副詞, fukushi)	conjunctions (接續詞, setsuzokushi)	interjections (感詞, kanshi)		
Ōwada Takeki	1901	eight parts of speech (八(はつ)品(ぴん)詞(し), happinshi)	nouns (名(めい)詞(し), meishi)		pronouns (代(だい)名(めい)詞(し), daimeishi)	adjectives (形(けい)容(よう)詞(し)／形(けい)狀(じやう)言(げん), keiyōshi / keijōgen)		verbs (動(どう)詞(し), dōshi)		particles (後(こう)詞(し)／後(こう)置(ち)詞(し), kōshi / kōchishi)				adverbs (副(ふく)詞(し), fukushi)	conjunctions (接(せつ)續(ぞく)詞(し), setsuzokushi)	interjections (感(かん)詞(し)／感(かん)嘆(たん)詞(し), kanshi / kantanshi)		
Takatsu Kuwasaburō	1891	ten parts of speech	nouns (名詞, meishi)		pronouns (代名詞, daimeishi)	adjectives (形容詞, keiyōshi)		verbs (動詞, dōshi)	auxiliaries (補助詞, hojoshi)	particles (關係詞, kankeishi)	affixes (附加詞, fukashi)			adverbs (副詞, fukushi)	conjunctions (接續詞, setsuzokushi)	interjections (感動詞, kandōshi)		
Okakura Yoshisaburō	1891	nine parts of speech	nouns (名詞, meishi)	numerals (數詞, sūshi)	pronouns (指詞, shishi)	adjectives (形狀詞, keijōshi)		verbs (動作詞, dōsashi)	auxiliaries (助辭, joji)					adverbs (副詞, fukushi)	conjunctions (接詞, sesshi)	interjections (感詞／喚詞, kanshi)		
Hayama Hisanori	1891	eight parts of speech (八品(ぴん)詞(し), happinshi)	nouns (名(めい)詞(し), meishi)		pronouns (代(だい)名(めい)詞(し), daimeishi)	adjectives (形(けい)容(よう)詞(し), keiyōshi)		verbs (動(どう)詞(し), dōshi)		particles (後(こう)詞(し), kōshi)				adverbs (副(ふく)詞(し), fukushi)	conjunctions (接(せつ)續(ぞく)詞(し), setsuzokushi)	interjections (感(かん)歎(たん)詞(し), kantanshi)		
Hirata Moritane	1893	eight parts of speech	nouns (實名詞, jitsumeishi)		pronouns (代名詞, daimeishi)	adjectives (形容詞, keiyōshi)		verbs (動詞, dōshi)		particles (助成詞, joseishi)				adverbs (副詞, fukushi)	conjunctions (接續詞, setsuzokushi)	interjections (感歎詞, kantanshi)		
Shinbo Iwaji	1896	eight parts of speech (八品詞, happinshi)	nouns (名詞, meishi)		pronouns (代名詞, daimeishi)	adjectives (形容詞, keiyōshi)		verbs (動詞, dōshi)		particles (後詞, kōshi)				adverbs (副詞, teishi)	conjunctions (接續詞, setsuzokushi)	interjections (感歎詞, kantanshi)		
Shiratori Kikuji	1893	nine parts of speech	nouns (名詞, meishi)			adjectives (形容動詞, keiyō dōshi)		verbs (作用動詞, sayō dōshi)	auxiliaries (動辭, dōji)	particles (靜辭, seiji)				adverbs (副詞, fukushi)	conjunctions (接續詞, setsuzokushi)	interjections (感歎詞, kantanshi)		adverbial forms (添詞／發語, tenshi / hatsugo)
Shiratori Kikuji	1898	ten parts of speech (十種, jisshu)	nouns (名詞／体言, meishi / taigen)		pronouns (代名詞, daimeishi)	adjectives (形容詞, keiyōshi)		verbs (動詞／作用言, dōshi / sayōgen)	auxiliaries (助動詞, jodōshi)	particles (弖爾乎波／弖爾波, tenioha / teniha)	affixes (冠詞, kanshi)			adverbs (副詞, fukushi)	conjunctions (接續詞, setsuzokushi)	interjections (感動詞, kandōshi)		
Matsushita Daizaburō	1898	eight parts of speech (八品詞, happinshi)	nouns (名詞, meishi)		pronouns (代名詞, daimeishi)	adjectives (形狀詞, keijōshi)		verbs (動詞, dōshi)					postpositions (後置詞, kōchishi)	adverbs (程詞, teishi) (Note: Translated by the author as intensive.)	conjunctions (接續詞, setsuzokushi)	interjections (感動詞, kandōshi)		
Matsushita Daizaburō	1901	eight parts of speech (八品詞, happinshi)	nouns (名詞, meishi)		pronouns (代名詞, daimeishi)	adjectives (形狀詞, keijōshi)		verbs (動詞, dōshi)					postpositions (後置詞, kōchishi)	adverbs (接用詞, setsuyōshi)	conjunctions (接續詞, setsuzokushi)	interjections (間投詞, kantōshi)		
Matsushita Daizaburō	1924	five parts of speech (五品詞, gohinshi)	nouns (名詞, meishi)			verbs (動詞, dōshi)								adverbs (副詞, fukushi)		interjections (感動詞, kandōshi)	attributives (形容詞, keiyōshi) (Note: The same term is confusingly used for both "attributives" here as a distinct part of speech, and for "adjectives" which are subsumed by the part of speech of dōshi (動詞). The distinction is marked with "western" (西洋, seiyō) "attributives" and "Japanese" (日本, Nihon) "adjectives." The author suggested "stative verbs" (狀態動詞, jōtai dōshi) as a replacement for "Japanese adjectives." Even though these are "attributives," the author's translation remains adjective.)	
Matsushita Daizaburō	1928	five parts of speech (五品詞, gohinshi)	nouns (名詞, meishi)			verbs (動詞, dōshi)								adverbs (副詞, fukushi)		interjections (感動詞, kandōshi)	attributives (副體詞, fukutaishi) (Note: Translated by the author as adjective. As this is a revised edition of the 1924 grammar, fukutaishi was intended as a replacement for the confusing unorthodox use of keiyōshi (形容詞) as meaning "attributives." As for keiyōshi (形容詞) as meaning "adjectives," "adjectival verbs" (形容動詞, keiyō dōshi) is used instead.)	
Morishita Matsue	1900	eight parts of speech (八品詞, happinshi)	nouns (名詞, meishi)		pronouns (代名詞, daimeishi)	adjectives (形容詞, keiyōshi)		verbs (動詞, dōshi)	auxiliaries (助詞, joshi)					adverbs (副詞, fukushi)	conjunctions (接續詞, setsuzokushi)	interjections (感動詞, kandōshi)		
Matsudaira Shizuka	1900	nine parts of speech (九品／九品詞, kyūhin / kyūhinshi)	nouns (名詞, meishi)		pronouns (代名詞, daimeishi)	adjectives (形容詞, keiyōshi)		verbs (動詞, dōshi)	auxiliaries (助動詞, jodōshi)	particles (助詞, joshi)				adverbs (副詞, fukushi)	conjunctions (接續詞, setsuzokushi)	interjections (感動詞, kandōshi)		
Matsudaira Shizuka	1908	ten parts of speech	nouns (名詞, meishi)	numerals (數詞, sūshi)	pronouns (代名詞, daimeishi)	adjectives (形容詞, keiyōshi)		verbs (動詞, dōshi)	auxiliaries (助動詞, jodōshi)	particles (助詞, joshi)				adverbs (副詞, fukushi)	conjunctions (接續詞, setsuzokushi)	interjections (感動詞, kandōshi)		
Mitsuchi Chūzō	1901	nine parts of speech (九品詞, kyūhinshi)	nouns (名詞, meishi)		pronouns (代名詞, daimeishi)	adjectives (形容詞, keiyōshi)		verbs (動詞, dōshi)	auxiliaries (助動詞, jodōshi)	particles (助詞, joshi)				adverbs (副詞, fukushi)	conjunctions (接續詞, setsuzokushi)	interjections (感動詞, kandōshi)		
Kanai Yasuzō	1901	ten parts of speech	nouns (名詞, meishi)	numerals (數詞, sūshi)	pronouns (代名詞, daimeishi)	adjectives (形容詞, keiyōshi)		verbs (動詞, dōshi)	auxiliaries (助動詞, jodōshi)	particles (てにをは, tenioha)				adverbs (副詞, fukushi)	conjunctions (接續詞, setsuzokushi)	interjections (感詞, kanshi)		
Ishikawa Kuraji	1901	nine parts of speech (九ひんし)	nouns (なことば, nakotoba)		pronouns (かえことば, kaekotoba)	adjectives (さまことば, samakotoba)		verbs (わざことば, wazakotoba)	auxiliaries (すけことば, sukekotoba)	particles (あとことば, atokotoba)				adverbs (そえことば, soekotoba)	conjunctions (つなぎことば, tsunagikotoba)	interjections (なげきことば, nagekikotoba)		
Suzuki Nobuyuki	1902	ten parts of speech (十種, jisshu)	nouns (名詞, meishi)	numerals (數詞, sūshi)	pronouns (代名詞, daimeishi)	adjectives (形容詞, keiyōshi)		verbs (動詞, dōshi)	auxiliaries (助動詞, jodōshi)	particles (テニヲハ, tenioha)				adverbs (副詞, fukushi)	conjunctions (接續詞, setsuzokushi)	interjections (感動詞, kandōshi)		
Suzuki Nobuyuki	1904	ten parts of speech (十種, jisshu)	nouns (名詞, meishi)	numerals (數詞, sūshi)	pronouns (代名詞, daimeishi)	adjectives (形容詞, keiyōshi)		verbs (動詞, dōshi)	auxiliaries (助動詞, jodōshi)		affixes (接辭, setsuji)			adverbs (副詞, fukushi)	conjunctions (接續詞, setsuzokushi)	interjections (感歎詞／歎詞, kantanshi / tanshi)		
Suzuki Nobuyuki	1906	ten parts of speech (十種, jisshu)	nouns (名詞, meishi)	numerals (數詞, sūshi)	pronouns (代名詞, daimeishi)	adjectives (形容詞, keiyōshi)		verbs (動詞, dōshi)	auxiliaries (助動詞, jodōshi)	affixes (辭, ji)				adverbs (副詞, fukushi)	conjunctions (接續詞, setsuzokushi)	interjections (感歎詞／感嘆詞, kantanshi)		
Haga Yaichi	1905	ten parts of speech (十品詞, jippinshi)	nouns (名詞, meishi)	numerals (數詞, sūshi)	pronouns (代名詞, daimeishi)	adjectives (形容詞, keiyōshi)		verbs (動詞, dōshi)	auxiliaries (助動詞, jodōshi)	particles (助詞, joshi)				adverbs (副詞, fukushi)	conjunctions (接續詞, setsuzokushi)	interjections (感動詞, kandōshi)		
Yoshioka Kyōsuke	1906	ten parts of speech	nouns (名詞, meishi)	numerals (數詞, sūshi)	pronouns (代名詞, daimeishi)	adjectives (形容詞, keiyōshi)		verbs (動詞, dōshi)	auxiliaries (助動詞, jodōshi)	particles (天爾乎波, tenioha)				adverbs (副詞, fukushi)	conjunctions (接續詞, setsuzokushi)	interjections (感歎詞, kantanshi)		
Yoshioka Kyōsuke	1933	ten parts of speech	nouns (名詞, meishi)	numerals (數詞, sūshi)	pronouns (代名詞, daimeishi)	adjectives (形容詞, keiyōshi)		verbs (動詞, dōshi)	auxiliaries (助動詞, jodōshi)	particles (助詞, joshi)				adverbs (副詞, fukushi)	conjunctions (接續詞, setsuzokushi)	interjections (感歎詞, kantanshi)		
Mitsuya Shigematsu	1908	nine parts of speech (七詞二辭, shichishi niji) (Note: Some grammarians made a distinction between shi (詞) and ji (辭), which are equivalent to the modern terms jiritsugo (自立語; "free forms") and fuzokugo (付属語; "bound forms") respectively. Ji (辭) or fuzokugo (付属語) consist of auxiliaries and particles, while shi (詞) or jiritsugo (自立語) consist of everything else. The names jodōshi (助動詞) and joshi (助詞) were customary despite the label ji (辭).)	nouns (名詞, meishi)		pronouns (代名詞, daimeishi)	adjectives (形容詞, keiyōshi)		verbs (動詞, dōshi)	auxiliaries (助動詞／動助辭／助用言, jodōshi / dōjoji / joyōgen)	particles (てにをは／靜助辭／助體言, tenioha / seijoji / jotaigen)				adverbs (副詞, fukushi)	conjunctions (接續詞, setsuzokushi)	interjections (感動詞, kandōshi)		
Hoshina Kōichi	1909	ten parts of speech	nouns (名詞, meishi)	numerals (數詞, sūshi)	pronouns (代名詞, daimeishi)	adjectives (形容詞, keiyōshi)		verbs (動詞, dōshi)	auxiliaries (助動詞, jodōshi)	particles (助詞, joshi)				adverbs (副詞, fukushi)	conjunctions (接續詞, setsuzokushi)	interjections (感動詞, kandōshi)		
Hoshina Kōichi	1917	nine parts of speech	nouns (名詞, meishi)		pronouns (代名詞, daimeishi)	adjectives (形容詞, keiyōshi)		verbs (動詞, dōshi)	auxiliaries (助動詞, jodōshi)	particles (助詞, joshi)				adverbs (副詞, fukushi)	conjunctions (接續詞, setsuzokushi)	interjections (感動詞, kandōshi)		
Tsuge Zenzō	1916	six parts of speech (六品詞, roppinshi)	nouns (名詞, meishi)		pronouns (代名詞, daimeishi)	adjectives (形容詞, keiyōshi)		verbs (動詞, dōshi)	auxiliaries (助辭, joji)					adverbs (語辭, gyoji)				
Yamada Yoshio	1917	nine parts of speech (九品詞, kyūhinshi)	nouns (名詞, meishi)		pronouns (代名詞, daimeishi)	adjectives (形容詞, keiyōshi)		verbs (動詞, dōshi)	auxiliaries (助動詞, jodōshi)	particles (助詞, joshi)				adverbs (副詞, fukushi)	conjunctions (接續詞, setsuzokushi)	interjections (感動詞, kandōshi)		
Yamada Yoshio	1922	ten parts of speech (十品詞, jippinshi)	nouns (名詞, meishi)	numerals (數詞, sūshi)	pronouns (代名詞, daimeishi)	adjectives (形容詞, keiyōshi)		verbs (動詞, dōshi)	auxiliaries (助動詞, jodōshi)	particles (助詞, joshi)				adverbs (副詞, fukushi)	conjunctions (接續詞, setsuzokushi)	interjections (感動詞, kandōshi)		
Yamada Yoshio	1938	nine parts of speech	nouns (名詞, meishi)		pronouns (代名詞, daimeishi)	adjectives (形容詞, keiyōshi)		verbs (動詞, dōshi)	auxiliaries (助動詞, jodōshi)	particles (助詞, joshi)				adverbs (副詞, fukushi)	conjunctions (接續詞, setsuzokushi)	interjections (感動詞, kandōshi)		
Fujimura Tsukuru and Shimazu Hisamoto	1921	nine parts of speech (九品詞, kyūhinshi)	nouns (名詞, meishi)		pronouns (代名詞, daimeishi)	adjectives (形容詞, keiyōshi)		verbs (動詞, dōshi)	auxiliaries (助動詞, jodōshi)	particles (助詞, joshi)				adverbs (副詞, fukushi)	conjunctions (接續詞, setsuzokushi)	interjections (感動詞, kandōshi)		
Yoshizawa Yoshinori	1923	ten parts of speech	nouns (名詞, meishi)	numerals (數詞, sūshi)	pronouns (代名詞, daimeishi)	adjectives (形容詞, keiyōshi)		verbs (動詞, dōshi)	auxiliaries (助動詞, jodōshi)	particles (助詞, joshi)				adverbs (副詞, fukushi)	conjunctions (接續詞, setsuzokushi)	interjections (感動詞, kandōshi)		
Hashimoto Shinkichi	1935	nine parts of speech (九品詞, kyūhinshi)	nouns (名詞, meishi)		pronouns (代名詞, daimeishi)	adjectives (形容詞, keiyōshi)		verbs (動詞, dōshi)	auxiliaries (助動詞, jodōshi)	particles (助詞, joshi)				adverbs (副詞, fukushi)	conjunctions (接續詞, setsuzokushi)	interjections (感動詞, kandōshi)		
Tōjō Misao	1937	eleven parts of speech	nouns (名詞, meishi)	numerals (數詞, sūshi)	pronouns (代名詞, daimeishi)	adjectives (形容詞, keiyōshi)	adjectival verbs (形容動詞, keiyō dōshi)	verbs (動詞, dōshi)	auxiliaries (助動詞, jodōshi)	particles (助詞, joshi)				adverbs (副詞, fukushi)	conjunctions (接續詞, setsuzokushi)	interjections (感動詞, kandōshi)		
Hiroshima Higher Normal School	1937	ten parts of speech	nouns (名詞, meishi)		pronouns (代名詞, daimeishi)	adjectives (形容詞, keiyōshi)	adjectival verbs (形容動詞, keiyō dōshi)	verbs (動詞, dōshi)	auxiliaries (助動詞, jodōshi)	particles (助詞, joshi)				adverbs (副詞, fukushi)	conjunctions (接續詞, setsuzokushi)	interjections (感動詞, kandōshi)		
Iwai Yoshio	1937	ten parts of speech	nouns (名詞, meishi)		pronouns (代名詞, daimeishi)	adjectives (形容詞, keiyōshi)	adjectival verbs (形容動詞, keiyō dōshi)	verbs (動詞, dōshi)	auxiliaries (助動詞, jodōshi)	particles (助詞, joshi)				adverbs (副詞, fukushi)	conjunctions (接續詞, setsuzokushi)	interjections (感動詞, kandōshi)		
Kindaichi Kyōsuke	1939	nine parts of speech (九品詞, kyūhinshi)	nouns (名詞, meishi)		pronouns (代名詞, daimeishi)	adjectives (形容詞, keiyōshi)		verbs (動詞, dōshi)	auxiliaries (助動詞, jodōshi)	particles (助詞, joshi)				adverbs (副詞, fukushi)	conjunctions (接續詞, setsuzokushi)	interjections (間投詞, kantōshi)		
Iwabuchi Etsutarō	1943	ten parts of speech	nouns (名詞, meishi)			adjectives (形容詞, keiyōshi)	adjectival verbs (形容動詞, keiyō dōshi)	verbs (動詞, dōshi)	auxiliaries (助動詞, jodōshi)	particles (助詞, joshi)				adverbs (副詞, fukushi)	conjunctions (接續詞, setsuzokushi)	interjections (感動詞, kandōshi)	attributives (連體詞, rentaishi)	

The term keiyō dōshi (形容動詞; lit. 'adjectival verb') assumed different meanings, such as a verb form (ren'yōkei (連用形) or rentaikei (連体形)) that precedes a noun, or as a proposed alternative to keiyōshi (形容詞), because Japanese "adjectives" are verb-like in nature, unlike European adjectives. As shown in the table, Matsushita Daizaburō (1924) used keiyōshi explicitly for the Eurocentric idea of adjectives as words that precede nouns, while reserving keiyō dōshi for Japanese "adjectives" as verb-like words (although later in 1928, he swapped out keiyōshi for fukutaishi (副體詞) to avoid confusion, on the model of fukushi (副詞) as words that precede verbs). Ochiai Naobumi (1895) defined keiyō dōshi not as a grammatical category, but as a semantic one with meanings similar to those of stative verbs (rakka yuki-ni nitari (落花雪に似たり; lit. 'as for falling flowers, they are like snow'), yama-wa enpō-ni ari (山は遠方に在り; lit. 'as for the mountain, it is far away')). It was not until Haga Yaichi's usage in 1905 that keiyō dōshi came to be refer to adjectival words whose shūshikei (終止形) ended with nari (なり) or tari (たり) (in modern Japanese, they end with da (だ)).

The gakkō bunpō (学校文法; lit. 'school grammar') of today has followed Iwabuchi Etsutarō's model outlined in his 1943 grammar, Chūtō Bunpō (中等文法), compiled for the Ministry of Education, Science, Sports and Culture (文部省, Monbushō). It recognizes 10 parts of speech as shown in the table.

Among historical classifications, the grammarian Matsushita Daizaburō notably compared his own terminology to the terminologies translated from and modeled after European ones at the time. In particular, he rejected the equation of what were dubbed keiyōshi (形容詞) in Japanese to the concept of "adjectives" in European grammars, although he revised his systems over the years, which ended up conforming to the popular usage of the term keiyōshi. According to Matsushita (1930):

Matsushita Daizaburō's own terminology			European-based terminology for Japanese grammar (Note: Mainly cited from Ōtsuki Fumihiko.)	European-based terminology for European grammars (Note: Mainly translated from Dutch, Latin and English terminologies.)	English terminology
meishi (名詞)	jisshitsu meishi (實質名詞) (Note: Lexical nouns.)	honmeishi (本名詞)	meishi (名詞)		noun
meishi (名詞)	jisshitsu meishi (實質名詞)	daimeishi (代名詞)	daimeishi (代名詞)	daimeishi (代名詞)	pronoun
meishi (名詞)	jisshitsu meishi (實質名詞)	mitei meishi (未定名詞) (Note: Interrogative "pronouns" such as dare (誰), doko (どこ), etc.)	daimeishi (代名詞)	daimeishi (代名詞)	pronoun
meishi (名詞)	keishiki meishi (形式名詞) (Note: Literally, "formal nouns," as in "nouns in form only." They are grammaticalized nouns used to nominalize other parts of speech, nowadays spelt in hiragana, such as koto (こと), mono (もの), etc.)		(Note: Currently, this missing slot would be filled with keishiki meishi (形式名詞).)	daimeishi (代名詞)	pronoun
fukutaishi (副體詞) (Note: This term was coined by analogy with fukushi (副詞; "adverb"), and would be equivalent to adnoun in English. Formerly keiyōshi (形容詞). Attributive words such as ko-no (この), aru (或る), etc.)			(Note: Currently, this missing slot would be filled with rentaishi (連体詞).)	keiyōshi (形容詞)	adjective
dōshi (動詞)	keiyōshi (形容詞) (Note: Formerly jōtai dōshi (狀態動詞), then keiyō dōshi (形容動詞).)		keiyōshi (形容詞)	(Note: Currently, this missing slot would be filled with keiyōshi (形容詞), which Matsushita objected to. Ōtsuki Fumihiko, despite cautioning against the equation of this class of Japanese words to the class of "adjectives" in European grammars, still used keiyōshi for both, while tentatively proposing keiyō dōshi (形容動詞) as an alternative.)	
dōshi (動詞)	dōsashi (動作詞) (Note: Formerly dōsa dōshi (動作動詞).)		dōshi (動詞)		verb
fukushi (副詞)	jisshitsu fukushi (實質副詞)		fukushi (副詞)		adverb
fukushi (副詞)	keishiki fukushi (形式副詞)	setsuzokushi (接續詞)			conjunction
fukushi (副詞)	keishiki fukushi (形式副詞)	kichaku fukushi (歸著副詞)		zenchishi (前置詞)	preposition
kandōshi (感動詞)				kantōshi (間投詞) (Note: Literal translation of the Latin interiectiō lit. 'between-throwing'. Formerly kandōshi (感動詞).)	interjection

The distinction between Japanese so-called "adjectives" and European true adjectives reflect in how differently they inflect. European adjectives are a type of nouns, that is, words that decline and express case, gender and number, and that include substantive nouns (or just substantives or nouns), adjective nouns (or just adjectives), numeral nouns (or just numerals) and pronouns (see Part of speech § Western tradition). Japanese "adjectives", on the other hand, do not decline, but conjugate and express tense, mood, aspect, evidentiality, etc., and thus are more similar to European verbs.

=== Japanese as a topic-prominent language ===
In discourse pragmatics, the term topic refers to what a section of discourse is about. At the beginning of a section of discourse, the topic is usually unknown, in which case it is usually necessary to explicitly mention it. As the discourse carries on, the topic need not be the grammatical subject of each new sentence.

Starting with Middle Japanese, the grammar evolved so as to explicitly distinguish topics from nontopics. This is done by two distinct particles (short words which do not change form). Consider the following pair of sentences:

犬 が サンド を 食べている。
inu ga sando o tabeteiru
dog NONTOPIC sandwich OBJ eat

犬 は サンド を 食べている。
inu wa sando o tabeteiru
dog TOPIC sandwich OBJ eat

In the first sentence the dog (犬, inu) is not a discourse topic—not yet; in the second sentence it is a discourse topic. In linguistics (specifically, in discourse pragmatics) a sentence such as the second one (with wa) is termed a presentational sentence because its function in the discourse is to present dog as a topic, to "broach it for discussion". Once a referent has been established as the topic of the current monolog or dialog, then in (formal) modern Japanese its marking will change from ga to wa.

To better explain the difference, the first sentence can be translated to "There's a dog eating a sandwich", while the second sentence can be translated to "Speaking of the dog, it's eating a sandwich"; these renderings reflect a discourse fragment in which "the dog" is being established as the topic of an extended discussion. The first sentence answers the question "What is going on?," whereas the second sentence answers the question "What is the dog doing?"

=== Liberal omission of the subject of a sentence ===
The grammatical subject is commonly omitted in Japanese, as in

日本 に 行きました
nihon ni ikimashita
Japan LOC go-POL-PFV
went to Japan

Subjects are mentioned when a topic is introduced, or in situations where an ambiguity might result from their omission. The preceding example sentence would most likely be uttered in the middle of a discourse, where who it is that "went to Japan" will be clear from what has already been said (or written).

== Sentences, phrases and words ==
Text (文章, bunshō) is composed of sentences (文, bun), which are in turn composed of phrases (文節, bunsetsu), which are its smallest coherent components. Like Chinese and classical Korean, written Japanese does not typically demarcate words with spaces; its agglutinative nature further makes the concept of a word rather different from words in English. The reader identifies word divisions by semantic cues and a knowledge of phrase structure. Phrases have a single meaning-bearing word, followed by a string of suffixes, auxiliary verbs and particles to modify its meaning and designate its grammatical role.

太陽が 東の 空に 昇る。
{taiyō ga} {higashi no} {sora ni} noboru
{sun SBJ} {east POSS} {sky LOC} rise
The sun rises in the eastern sky.

Some scholars romanize Japanese sentences by inserting spaces only at phrase boundaries (i.e., "taiyō-ga higashi-no sora-ni noboru"), treating an entire phrase as a single word. This represents an almost purely phonological conception of where one word ends and the next begins. There is some validity in taking this approach: phonologically, the postpositional particles merge with the structural word that precedes them, and within a phonological phrase, the pitch can have at most one fall. Usually, however, grammarians adopt a more conventional concept of word (単語, tango), one which invokes meaning and sentence structure.

=== Phrasal movement ===
In Japanese, phrasal constituents can be moved to the beginning or the end of the sentence. Leftward movement of a phrasal constituent is referred to as "scrambling".

== Word classification ==
In linguistics generally, words and affixes are often classified into two major word categories: lexical words, those that refer to the world outside of a discourse, and function words—also including fragments of words—which help to build the sentence in accordance with the grammar rules of the language. Lexical words include nouns, verbs, adjectives, adverbs, and sometimes prepositions and postpositions, while grammatical words or word parts include everything else. The native tradition in Japanese grammar scholarship seems to concur in this view of classification. This native Japanese tradition uses the terminology jiritsugo (自立語, independent words), for words having lexical meaning, and fuzokugo (付属語, auxiliary words), for words having a grammatical function.

Classical Japanese had some auxiliary verbs (i.e., they were independent words) which have become grammaticized in modern Japanese as inflectional suffixes, such as the past tense suffix -ta (which might have developed as a contraction of -te ari).

Traditional scholarship proposes a system of word classes differing somewhat from the above-mentioned. The "independent" words have the following categories.

katsuyōgo (活用語), word classes which have inflections

dōshi (動詞), verbs
keiyōshi (形容詞), i-type adjectives
keiyōdōshi (形容動詞), na-type adjectives

hikatsuyōgo (非活用語) or mukatsuyōgo (無活用語), word classes which do not have inflections

meishi (名詞), nouns
daimeishi (代名詞), pronouns
fukushi (副詞), adverbs
setsuzokushi (接続詞), conjunctions
kandōshi (感動詞), interjections
rentaishi (連体詞), prenominals

Ancillary words also divide into a nonconjugable class, containing grammatical particles (助詞, joshi) and counter words (助数詞, josūshi), and a conjugable class consisting of auxiliary verbs (助動詞, jodōshi). There is not wide agreement among linguists as to the English translations of the above terms.

=== Controversy over the characterization of adjectival nouns ===
Uehara (1998) observes that Japanese grammarians have disagreed as to the criteria that make some words inflectional and others not, in particular, the adjectival nouns – keiyōdōshi (形容動詞) or na-adjectives. (It is not disputed that nouns like hon 'book' are non-inflectional and that verbs and i-adjectives are inflectional.) The claim that adjectival nouns are inflectional rests on the claim that the element da, regarded as a copula by proponents of non-inflectional adjectival nouns, is really a suffix—an inflection. That is, kireida ('it is pretty') is a one-word sentence, not a two-word sentence, kirei da. However, numerous constructions show that da is less bound to the roots of nouns and adjectival nouns than -i and -(r)u are to the roots of i-adjectives and verbs, respectively.

(1) Reduplication for emphasis

ほら！ 本、本！ Hora! Hon, hon! ('See! It is a book!')
ほら！ きれい、きれい！ Hora! Kirei, kirei! ('See! It is pretty!')
ほら！ 古い、古い！ Hora! Furu-i, furu-i! ('See! It is old!') (the adjectival inflection -i cannot be left off)
ほら！ 動く、動く！Hora! Ugok-u, ugok-u! ('See! It does move!') (the verbal inflection -u cannot be left off)

(2) Questions. In Japanese, questions are formed by adding the particle ka (or in colloquial speech, just by changing the intonation of the sentence).

本 か？ Hon ka? ('Is it a book?')
きれい か？ Kirei ka? ('Is it pretty?')
古い か？ Furu-i ka? ('Is it old?) (-i cannot be left off)
動く か？ Ugok-u ka? ('Does it move?') (-u cannot be left off)

(3) Several epistemic modality predicates, e.g., mitai ('seem like')

本 みたい だ Hon mitai da ('It seems to be a book')
きれい みたい だ Kirei mitai da ('It seems to be pretty')
古い みたい だ Furu-i mitai da ('It seems to be old') (-i cannot be left off)
動く みたい だ Ugok-u mitai da ('It seems to move') (-u cannot be left off)

On the basis of such constructions, Uehara finds that the copula da is not suffixal and that adjectival nouns pattern with nouns in being non-inflectional.

Similarly, Eleanor Jorden considers this class of words a kind of nominal, not adjective, and refers to them as na-nominals in her textbook Japanese: The Spoken Language. However, traditional Japanese school grammar (学校文法, gakkō bunpō) classifies them as a distinct inflecting part of speech called keiyōdōshi (形容動詞), treating da as part of their inflectional paradigm rather than a separate word. Thus, the classification depends on whether one analyzes the copula as a separate word or an inflectional suffix.

== Nouns ==
Japanese has no grammatical gender, number, or articles; though the demonstrative sono (その, "that, those"), is often translatable as "the". Thus, linguists agree that Japanese nouns are noninflecting: neko (猫) can be translated as "cat", "cats", "a cat", "the cat", "some cats" and so forth, depending on context. However, as part of the extensive pair of grammatical systems that Japanese possesses for honorification (making discourse deferential to the addressee or even to a third party) and politeness, nouns too can be modified. Nouns take politeness prefixes (which have not been regarded as inflections): o- for native nouns, and go- for Sino-Japanese nouns. A few examples are given in the following table. In a few cases, there is suppletion, as with the first of the examples given below, '飯(meal/rice)'. (Note that while these prefixes are almost always written in hiragana as o- (お〜) or go- (ご〜), the 御 kanji represents both o and go in formal writing.)

Respectful forms of nouns
meaning	plain	respectful
meal	meshi (飯)	go-han (ご飯)
money	kane (金)	o-kane (お金)
body	karada (体)	o-karada (お体) onmi (御身)
word(s)	kotoba (言葉)	o-kotoba (お言葉) mikotonori (詔)

Lacking grammatical number, Japanese does not differentiate between count and mass nouns. A small number of nouns have collectives formed by reduplication (possibly accompanied by voicing and related processes (rendaku)); for example: hito (人, 'person') and hitobito (人々, 'people'). Reduplication is not productive. Words in Japanese referring to more than one of something are collectives, not plurals. Hitobito, for example, means "a lot of people" or "people in general"; it is never used to mean "two people". A phrase like edo no hitobito would be taken to mean "the people of Edo", or "the population of Edo", not "two people from Edo" or even "a few people from Edo". Similarly, yamayama means "multiple mountains" (a collective noun similar to German Gebirge "mountain range").

A limited number of nouns have collective forms that refer to groups of people. Examples include watashi-tachi (私たち, 'we'); anata-tachi (あなたたち, 'you' [plural]); bokura (僕ら, 'we' (less formal, more masculine)). One uncommon personal noun, ware (我, 'I', or in some cases, 'you'), has a much more common reduplicative collective form: wareware (我々, 'we').

The suffixes -tachi (達) and -ra (等) are by far the most common collectivizing suffixes. These are, again, not pluralizing suffixes: tarō-tachi does not mean "some number of people named Taro", but instead indicates the group including Taro. Depending on context, tarō-tachi might be translated into "Taro and his friends", "Taro and his siblings", "Taro and his family", or any other logical grouping that has Taro as the representative. Some words with collectives have become fixed phrases and (commonly) refer to one person. Specifically, kodomo (子供, 'child') and tomodachi (友達, 'friend') can be singular, even though -[t]omo and -[t]achi were originally collectivizing in these words; to unambiguously refer to groups of them, an additional collectivizing suffix is added: kodomo-tachi (子供たち, 'children') and tomodachi-tachi (友達たち, 'friends'), though tomodachi-tachi is somewhat uncommon. Tachi is sometimes applied to inanimate objects, kuruma (車, 'car') and kuruma-tachi (車たち, 'cars'), for example, but this usage is colloquial and indicates a high level of anthropomorphisation and childlikeness, and is proscribed and not broadly accepted as standard.

=== Grammatical case ===
Grammatical cases in Japanese are marked by particles placed after the nouns. A distinctive feature of Japanese is the presence of two cases which are roughly equivalent to the nominative case in other languages: one representing the sentence topic, other representing the subject. The most important case markers are the following:

- Nominative – ga (が) for subject, wa (は) for the topic
- Genitive – no (の)
- Dative – ni (に)
- Accusative – o (を)
- Lative – e (へ), used for destination direction (like in "to some place")
- Ablative – kara (から), used for source direction (like in "from some place")
- Instrumental/Locative – de (で)

=== Pronouns ===
Common pronouns
person	very informal	plain, informal	polite
first	ore (俺, male) atashi (あたし, female)	boku (僕, male) watashi (私, gender neutral)	watashi (私) watakushi (私)
second	anta (あんた) omae (お前)	kimi (君) anata (あなた)	anata (貴方) sochira (そちら)
third	aitsu (あいつ, pejorative)	kare (彼, referring to males) kanojo (彼女, referring to females) ano hito (あの人)	ano kata (あの方)

Although many grammars and textbooks mention pronouns (代名詞, daimeishi), Japanese lacks true pronouns. (Daimeishi can be considered a subset of nouns.) Strictly speaking, pronouns cannot take adjectives or other certain parts of speech as modifiers, but Japanese daimeishi can. For example, se no takai kare (背の高い彼, lit. "tall he") is grammatical in Japanese. (Note: This is permitted in Japanese because Japanese adjectives in many ways act like verbs (see section Adjectival verbs and nouns and the article Japanese adjectives for more details). Therefore, 背の高い can be viewed as a clause modifying the daimeishi 彼, similar to how clauses modify pronouns in English in a pronoun-headed phrase like "he who is tall".) Also, unlike true pronouns, Japanese daimeishi are not a closed class; new daimeishi are commonly introduced, and old ones go out of use relatively quickly or shift in politeness level over time (for example, kisama (貴様) and omae (お前) were historically respectful terms, but are now considered derogatory or highly informal).

A large number of daimeishi referring to people are translated as pronouns in their most common uses. Examples: kare (彼, he); kanojo (彼女, she); watashi (私, I); see also the adjoining table or a longer list. Some of these "personal nouns" such as onore (己, I (exceedingly humble)), or boku (僕, I (young male)), also have second-person uses: onore (おのれ) in second-person is an extremely rude "you", and boku in second-person is a diminutive "you" used for young boys. Kare and kanojo also mean "boyfriend" and "girlfriend" respectively, and this usage of the words is possibly more common than the use as pronouns.

Like other subjects, personal daimeishi are seldom used and are de-emphasized in Japanese. This is partly because Japanese sentences do not always require explicit subjects, and partly because names or titles are often used where pronouns would appear in a translation:

「小林さん は、 背 が 高い です ね。」
"Kobayashi-san wa, se ga takai desu ne."
(addressing Mr. Kobayashi) "You're pretty tall, aren't you?"

「専務、 明日 福岡市 西区 の 山本商事 の 社長 に 会って いただけます か？」
"Senmu, asu Fukuoka-shi nishi-ku no Yamamoto-shōji no shachō ni atte itadakemasu ka?"
(addressing the managing director) "Would it be possible for you to meet the president of Yamamoto Trading Co. in West Ward, Fukuoka tomorrow?"

The possible referents of daimeishi are sometimes constrained depending on the order of occurrence. The following pair of examples from Bart Mathias illustrates one such constraint.

本田君 に 会って、 彼 の 本 を 返した。
Honda-kun ni atte, kare no hon o kaeshita
(I) met Honda and returned his book. ("His" here can refer to Honda.)

彼 に 会って、 本田君 の 本 を 返した。
Kare ni atte, Honda-kun no hon o kaeshita
(I) met him and returned Honda's book. (Here, "him" cannot refer to Honda.)

=== Reflexive pronouns ===
English has a reflexive form of each personal pronoun (himself, herself, itself, themselves, etc.); Japanese, in contrast, has one main reflexive daimeishi, namely jibun (自分), which can also mean 'I'. The uses of the reflexive (pro)nouns in the two languages are very different, as demonstrated by the following literal translations (*=impossible, ??=ambiguous):

example	reason
＊ 歴史 は 自分 を 繰り返す。 * Rekishi wa jibun o kurikaesu. History repeats itself.	the target of jibun must be animate
ひろし は 健司 に 自分 の こと を 話した。 Hiroshi wa Kenji ni jibun no koto o hanashita. Hiroshi talked to Kenji about himself (=Hiroshi).	there is no ambiguity in this translation, as explained below
？？ 誠 は 静子 が 自分 を 大事 に する こと を 期待 して いる。 ?? Makoto wa Shizuko ga jibun o daiji ni suru koto o kitai shite iru. *Makoto expects that Shizuko will take good care of himself (=Makoto; note that Shizuko is female). Either "Makoto expects that Shizuko will take good care of him", or "Makoto expects that Shizuko will take good care of herself."	jibun can be in a different sentence or dependent clause, but its target is ambiguous

If the sentence has more than one grammatical or semantic subject, then the target of jibun is the subject of the primary or most prominent action; thus in the following sentence jibun refers unambiguously to Shizuko (even though Makoto is the grammatical subject) because the primary action is Shizuko's reading.

誠 は 静子 に 自分 の 家 で 本 を 読ませた。
Makoto wa Shizuko ni jibun no uchi de hon o yomaseta.
Makoto made Shizuko read book(s) in her house.

In practice the main action is not always discernible, in which case such sentences are ambiguous. The use of jibun in complex sentences follows non-trivial rules.

There are also equivalents to jibun such as mizukara. Other uses of the reflexive pronoun in English are covered by adverbs like hitorideni which is used in the sense of "by oneself". For example,

機械 が ひとりでに 動き出した。
kikai ga hitorideni ugokidashita.
The machine started operating by itself.

Change in a verb's valency is not accomplished by use of reflexive pronouns (in this Japanese is like English but unlike many other European languages). Instead, separate (but usually related) intransitive verbs and transitive verbs are used. In modern Japanese, there is no longer any productive morphology to derive new transitive verbs from intransitive ones, or vice versa.

=== Demonstratives ===
Demonstratives
	ko-	so-	a-	do-
-re	kore this one	sore that one	are that one over there	dore which one?
-no	kono (of) this	sono (of) that	ano (of) that over there	dono (of) what?
-nna	konna like this	sonna like that	anna like that over there	donna what sort of?
-ko	koko here	soko there	asoko ^{1} over there	doko where?
-chira ^{2}	kochira this way	sochira that way	achira that way over there	dochira which way?
-u ^{3}	kō in this manner	sō in that manner	ā ^{1} in that (other) manner	dō how? in what manner?
-itsu	koitsu this person	soitsu that person	aitsu that (other) person	doitsu who?

1. irregular formation
2. colloquially contracted to -cchi
3. -ou is represented by -ō

Demonstratives occur in the ko-, so-, and a- series. The ko- (proximal) series refers to things closer to the speaker than the hearer, the so- (medial) series for things closer to the hearer, and the a- (distal) series for things distant to both the speaker and the hearer. With do-, demonstratives turn into the corresponding interrogative form. Demonstratives can also be used to refer to people, for example

「こちら は 林さん です。」
"Kochira wa Hayashi-san desu."
"This is Mr. Hayashi."

Demonstratives limit, and therefore precede, nouns; thus kono hon (この本) for "this/my book", and sono hon (その本) for "that/your book".

When demonstratives are used to refer to things not visible to the speaker or the hearer, or to (abstract) concepts, they fulfill a related but different anaphoric role. The anaphoric distals are used for shared information between the speaker and the listener.

A： 先日、 札幌 に 行って 来ました。
A: Senjitsu, Sapporo ni itte kimashita.
A: I visited Sapporo recently.

B： あそこ （＊そこ） は いつ 行って も いい 所 です ね。
B: Asoko (*Soko) wa itsu itte mo ii tokoro desu ne.
B: Yeah, that's a great place to visit whenever you go.

Soko instead of asoko would imply that B does not share this knowledge about Sapporo, which is inconsistent with the meaning of the sentence. The anaphoric medials are used to refer to experience or knowledge that is not shared between the speaker and listener.

佐藤： 田中 と いう 人 が 昨日 死んだ ん だ って。
Satō: Tanaka to iu hito ga kinō shinda n da tte...
Sato: I heard that a man called Tanaka died yesterday...

森： えっ、 本当？
Mori: E', hontō?
Mori: Oh, really?

佐藤： だから、 その （＊あの） 人、 森さん の 昔 の 隣人 じゃ なかった っけ？
Satō: Dakara, sono (*ano) hito, Mori-san no mukashi no rinjin ja nakatta kke?
Sato: It's why I asked... wasn't he an old neighbour of yours?

Again, ano is inappropriate here because Sato does not (did not) know Tanaka personally. The proximal demonstratives do not have clear anaphoric uses. They can be used in situations where the distal series sound too disconnected:

一体 何 です か、 これ （＊あれ） は
Ittai nan desu ka, kore (*are) wa?
What on earth is this?

== Conjugable words ==
=== Stem forms ===
Conjugative suffixes and auxiliary verbs are attached to the stem forms of the affixee. In modern Japanese, there are six stem forms, ordered following from the -a, -i, -u, -e, -o endings that these forms have in 5-row (五段) verbs (according to the あ、い、う、え、お collation order of Japanese), where terminal and attributive forms are the same for verbs (hence only 5 surface forms), but differ for nominals, notably na-nominals.

Irrealis form (未然形, mizenkei) -a (and -ō)
is used for plain negative (of verbs), causative and passive constructions. The most common use of this form is with the -nai auxiliary that turns verbs into their negative (predicate) form. (See Verbs below.) The -ō version is used for volitional expression and formed by a euphonic change (音便, onbin).
Continuative form (連用形, ren'yōkei) -i
is used in a linking role (a kind of serial verb construction). This is the most productive stem form, taking on a variety of endings and auxiliaries, and can even occur independently in a sense similar to the -te ending. This form is also used to negate adjectives.
Terminal form (終止形, shūshikei) -u
is used at the ends of clauses in predicate positions. This form is also variously known as plain form (基本形, kihonkei) or dictionary form (辞書形, jishokei) – it is the form that verbs are listed under in a dictionary.
Attributive form (連体形, rentaikei) -u
is prefixed to nominals and is used to define or classify the noun, similar to a relative clause in English. In modern Japanese it is practically identical to the terminal form, except that verbs are generally not inflected for politeness; in old Japanese these forms differed. Further, na-nominals behave differently in terminal and attributive positions; see Adjectival verbs and nouns, below.
Hypothetical form (仮定形, kateikei) -e
is used for conditional and subjunctive forms, using the -ba ending.
Imperative form (命令形, meireikei) -e
is used to turn verbs into commands. Adjectives do not have an imperative stem form.

The application of conjugative suffixes to stem forms follow certain euphonic principles (音便, onbin).

=== Verbs ===
Verbs (動詞, dōshi) in Japanese are rigidly constrained to the end of a clause. This means that the predicate position is always located at the end of a sentence.

猫 は 魚 を 食べる
Neko wa sakana o taberu
Cat TOPIC fish OBJECT eat
"A cat eats fish"

The subject and objects of the verb are indicated by means of particles, and the grammatical functions of the verb (primarily tense and voice) are indicated by means of conjugation. When the subject and the dissertative topic coincide, the subject is often omitted; if the verb is intransitive, the entire sentence may consist of a single verb. Verbs have two tenses indicated by conjugation, past and non-past. The semantic difference between present and future is not indicated by means of conjugation. Usually there is no ambiguity as context makes it clear whether the speaker is referring to the present or future. Voice and aspect are also indicated by means of conjugation, and possibly agglutinating auxiliary verbs. For example, the continuative aspect is formed by means of the continuative conjugation known as the gerundive or -te form, and the auxiliary verb iru ("to be"); to illustrate, miru (見る, "to see") → mite iru (見ている, "to be seeing").

Verbs can be semantically classified based on certain conjugations.

Stative verbs
indicate existential properties, such as "to be" (いる, iru), "to be able to do" (出来る, dekiru), "to need" (要る, iru), etc. These verbs generally do not have a continuative conjugation with -iru because they are semantically continuative already.
Continual verbs
conjugate with the auxiliary -iru to indicate the progressive aspect. Examples: "to eat" (食べる, taberu), "to drink" (飲む, nomu), "to think" (考える, kangaeru). To illustrate the conjugation, taberu (食べる, "to eat") → tabete iru (食べている, "to be eating").
Punctual verbs
conjugate with -iru to indicate a repeated action, or a continuing state after some action. Example: shiru (知る, "to know") → shitte iru (知っている, "to be knowing"); utsu (打つ, "to hit") → utte iru (打っている, "to be hitting (repeatedly)").
Non-volitional verb
indicate uncontrollable action or emotion. These verbs generally have no volitional, imperative or potential conjugation. Examples: konomu (好む, "to like / to prefer" [emotive]), mieru (見える, "to be visible" [non-emotive]).
Movement verbs
indicate motion. Examples: aruku (歩く, "to walk"), kaeru (帰る, "to return"). In the continuative form (see § Verbal adverbs) they take the particle ni to indicate a purpose.

There are other possible classes, and a large amount of overlap between the classes.

Lexically, nearly every verb in Japanese is a member of exactly one of the following three regular conjugation groups (see also Japanese godan and ichidan verbs).

Group 2a (上一段, kami ichidan; lit. upper 1-row)
verbs with a stem ending in -i. The terminal stem form always rhymes with -iru. Examples: miru (見る, "to see"), kiru (着る, "to wear").
Group 2b (下一段, shimo ichidan; lit. lower 1-row)
verbs with a stem ending in -e. The terminal stem form always rhymes with -eru. Examples: taberu (食べる, "to eat"), kureru (くれる, "to give" (to someone of lower or more intimate status)). (Some Group 1 verbs resemble Group 2b verbs, but their stems end in r-, not -e.)
Group 1 (五段, godan; lit. 5-row)
verbs with a stem ending in a consonant. When this is r- and the verb ends in -eru, it is not apparent from the terminal form whether the verb is Group 1 or Group 2b, e.g. kaeru (帰る, "to return"). If the stem ends in w-, that consonant sound only appears in before the final -a of the irrealis form.

The "row" in the above classification means a row in the gojūon table. "Upper 1-row" means the row that is one row above the center row (the u-row) i.e. i-row. "Lower 1-row" means the row that is one row below the center row (the u-row) i.e. e-row. "5-row" means the conjugation runs through all 5 rows of the gojūon table. A conjugation is fully described by identifying both the row and the column in the gojūon table. For example, miru (見る, "to see") belongs to ma-column i-row conjugation (マ行上一段活用), taberu (食べる, "to eat") belongs to ba-column e-row conjugation (バ行下一段活用), and kaeru (帰る, "to return") belongs to ra-column 5-row conjugation (ラ行五段活用).

One should avoid confusing verbs in ra-column 5-row conjugation (ラ行五段活用) with verbs in i-row conjugation (上一段活用) or e-row conjugation (下一段活用). For example, kiru (切る, "to cut") belongs to ra-column 5-row conjugation (ラ行五段活用), whereas its homophone kiru (着る, "to wear") belongs to ka-column i-row conjugation (カ行上一段活用). Likewise, neru (練る, "to knead") belongs to ra-column 5-row conjugation (ラ行五段活用), whereas its homophone neru (寝る, "to sleep") belongs to na-column e-row conjugation (ナ行下一段活用).

Historically, Classical Japanese had upper and lower 1-row groups (上・下一段, kami/shimo ichidan), upper and lower 2-row groups (上・下二段, kami/shimo nidan) and a 4-row group (四段, yodan). The nidan verbs became most of the ichidan verbs in modern Japanese (only a handful of kami ichidan verbs and a single shimo ichidan verb existed in classical Japanese). The yodan group was reclassified as the godan group during the post-WWII writing reform in 1946, to write Japanese as it is pronounced. Since verbs have migrated across groups in the history of the language, the conjugation of classical verbs cannot be ascertained from knowledge of modern Japanese alone.

Of the irregular classes, there are two:

sa-group
which has only one member, suru (する, "to do"). In Japanese grammars these words are classified as sa-hen (サ変), an abbreviation of sa-gyō henkaku katsuyō (サ行変格活用), sa-row irregular conjugation).
ka-group
which also has one member, kuru (来る, "to come"). The Japanese name for this class is ka-gyō henkaku katsuyō (カ行変格活用) or simply ka-hen (カ変).

Classical Japanese had two further irregular classes, the na-group, which contained shinu (死ぬ, "to die") and inu (往ぬ, "to go"/"to die"), the ra-group, which included such verbs as ari (あり), the equivalent of modern aru, as well as quite a number of extremely irregular verbs that cannot be classified.

The following table illustrates the stem forms of the above conjugation groups, with the root indicated with dots. For example, to find the hypothetical form of the group 1 verb kaku (書く), look in the second row to find its root, kak-, then in the hypothetical row to get the ending -e, giving the stem form kake. When there are multiple possibilities, they are listed in the order of increasing rarity.

Group	1		2a	2b	sa	ka
Example	tsuka(w). (使・)	kak. (書・)	mi. (見・)	tabe. (食べ・)	sa	ka
Irrealis form^{1} (未然形, mizenkei)	tsukaw.a (使わ)^{2} tsuka.o (使お)	kak.a (書か) kak.o (書こ)	mi. (見)	tabe. (食べ)	sa (さ) shi (し) se (せ)	ko (来)
Continuative form (連用形, ren'yōkei)	tsuka.i (使い)	kak.i (書き)	mi. (見)	tabe. (食べ)	shi (し)	ki (来)
Terminal form (終止形, shūshikei)	tsuka.u (使う)	kak.u (書く)	mi.ru (見る)	tabe.ru (食べる)	suru (する)	kuru (来る)
Attributive form	Same as terminal form					
Hypothetical form (仮定形, kateikei)	tsuka.e (使え)	kak.e (書け)	mi.re (見れ)	tabe.re (食べれ)	sure (すれ)	kure (来れ)
Imperative form (命令形, meireikei)	tsuka.e (使え)	kak.e (書け)	mi.ro (見ろ) mi.yo (見よ)	tabe.ro (食べろ) tabe.yo (食べよ)	shiro (しろ) seyo (せよ) sei (せい)	koi (来い)

1. The -a and -o irrealis forms for Group 1 verbs were historically one, but since the post-WWII spelling reforms they have been written differently. In modern Japanese the -o form is used only for the volitional mood and the -a form is used in all other cases; see also the conjugation table below.
2. The unexpected ending is due to the verb's root being tsukaw- but w- only being pronounced before -a in modern Japanese.

The above are only the stem forms of the verbs; to these one must add various verb endings in order to get the fully conjugated verb. The following table lists the most common conjugations. Note that in some cases the form is different depending on the conjugation group of the verb. See Japanese verb conjugations for a full list.

	formation rule	group 1	group 2a	group 2b	sa-group	ka-group
	formation rule	kaku (書く)	miru (見る)	taberu (食べる)	suru (する)	kuru (来る)
polite imperfective	cont. + masu (ます)	kaki.masu (書き・ます)	mi.masu (見・ます)	tabe.masu (食べ・ます)	shi.masu (し・ます)	ki.masu (来・ます)
plain perfective	cont. + ta (た)	kai.ta (書い・た)^{2}	mi.ta (見・た)	tabe.ta (食べ・た)	shi.ta (し・た)	ki.ta (来・た)
plain negative imperfective	irrealis + nai (ない)	kaka.nai (書か・ない)	mi.nai (見・ない)	tabe.nai (食べ・ない)	shi.nai (し・ない)	ko.nai (来・ない)
plain negative perfective	irrealis + nakatta (なかった)	kaka.nakatta (書か・なかった)	mi.nakatta (見・なかった)	tabe.nakatta (食べ・なかった)	shi.nakatta (し・なかった)	ko.nakatta (来・なかった)
-te form (gerundive)	cont. + -te (て)	kai.te (書いて)^{2}	mi.te (見て)	tabe.te (食べて)	shi.te (して)	ki.te (来て)
provisional conditional	hyp. + ba (ば)	kake.ba (書け・ば)	mire.ba (見れ・ば)	tabere.ba (食べれ・ば)	sure.ba (すれ・ば)	kure.ba (来れ・ば)
past conditional	cont. + tara (たら)	kai.tara (書いたら)^{2}	mi.tara (見たら)	tabe.tara (食べたら)	shi.tara (したら)	ki.tara (来たら)
volitional	irrealis + u (う)	kako.u (書こ・う)				
volitional	irrealis + yō (よう)		mi.yō (見・よう)	tabe.yō (食べ・よう)	shi.yō (し・よう)	ko.yō (来・よう)
passive	irrealis + reru (れる)	kaka.reru (書か・れる)			sa.reru (さ・れる)	
passive	irrealis + rareru (られる)		mi.rareru (見・られる)	tabe.rareru (食べ・られる)		ko.rareru (来・られる)
causative	irrealis + seru (せる)	kaka.seru (書か・せる)			sa.seru (さ・せる)	
causative	irrealis + saseru (させる)		mi.saseru (見・させる)	tabe.saseru (食べ・させる)		ko.saseru (来・させる)
potential	hyp. + ru (る)	kake.ru (書け・る)			dekiru (出来る)^{1}	
potential	irrealis + rareru (られる)		mi.rareru (見・られる)	tabe.rareru (食べ・られる)		ko.rareru (来・られる)

1. This is an entirely different verb; suru (する) has no potential form.
2. These forms change depending on the final syllable of the verb's dictionary form (whether u, ku, gu, su, etc.). For details, see Euphonic changes, below, and the article Japanese verb conjugation.

The polite ending -masu conjugates as a group 1 verb, except that the negative imperfective and perfective forms are -masen and -masen deshita respectively, and certain conjugations are in practice rarely if ever used. The passive and potential endings -reru and -rareru, and the causative endings -seru and -saseru all conjugate as group 2b verbs. Multiple verbal endings can therefore agglutinate. For example, a common formation is the causative-passive ending: -sase-rareru.

僕 は 姉 に 納豆 を 食べさせられた。
Boku wa ane ni nattō o tabesaserareta.
I was made to eat nattō by my (elder) sister.

As should be expected, the vast majority of theoretically possible combinations of conjugative endings are not semantically meaningful.

==== Transitive and intransitive verbs ====
Japanese has a large variety of related pairs of transitive verbs (that take a direct object) and intransitive verbs (that do not usually take a direct object), such as the transitive hajimeru (始める, someone or something begins an activity), and the intransitive hajimaru (始まる, an activity begins).

transitive verb	intransitive verb
One thing acts out the transitive verb on another; Usually uses o (を) to link to the direct object	The intransitive verb passively happens without direct intervention.; Usually uses ga (が) or wa (は) to link subject and verb.
先生 が 授業 を 始める。 Sensei ga jugyō o hajimeru. The teacher starts the class.	授業 が 始まる。 Jugyō ga hajimaru. The class starts.
車 に 何 か を 入れる; Kuruma ni nani ka o ireru To put something in the car	車 に 入る; Kuruma ni hairu To enter the car
dasu (出す, 'to take/put out')	deru (出る, 'to exit')
kesu (消す, 'to extinguish')	kieru (消える, 'to go out')
akeru (開ける, 'to open [something]')	aku (開く, 'to open'/'to be open')
tsukeru (付ける, 'to attach [something]')	tsuku (付く, 'to attach'/'to be attached')
shimeru (閉める, 'to close [something]')	shimaru (閉まる, 'to close'/'to be closed')
mitsukeru (見つける, 'to find')	mitsukaru (見つかる, 'to be found')
nuku (抜く, 'to extract')	nukeru (抜ける, 'to come out')
okosu (起こす, 'to wake [someone] up')	okiru (起きる, 'to wake up')
umu (生む, 'to give birth')	umareru (生まれる, 'to be born')

Note: Some intransitive verbs (usually verbs of motion) take what looks like a direct object, but is not. For example, hanareru (離れる, to leave):

私 は 東京 を 離れる。
Watashi wa Tōkyō o hanareru.
I leave Tokyo.

=== Adjectival verbs and nouns ===
Semantically speaking, words that denote attributes or properties are primarily distributed between two morphological classes (there are also a few other classes):

- adjectival verbs (形容詞, keiyōshi; conventionally called "i-adjectives")– these have roots and conjugating stem forms, and are semantically and morphologically similar to stative verbs.
- adjectival nouns (形容動詞, keiyōdōshi; lit. "adjectival verb", conventionally called "na-adjectives")– these are nouns that combine with the copula.

Unlike adjectives in languages like English, i-adjectives in Japanese inflect for aspect and mood, like verbs. Japanese adjectives do not have comparative or superlative inflections; comparatives and superlatives have to be marked periphrastically using adverbs like motto ('more') and ichiban ('most').

Every adjective in Japanese can be used in an attributive position, and nearly every Japanese adjective can be used in a predicative position. There are a few Japanese adjectives that cannot predicate, known as rentaishi (連体詞, attributives), which are derived from other word classes; examples include ōkina (大きな, "big"), chiisana (小さな, "small"), and okashina (おかしな, "strange") which are all stylistic na-type variants of normal i-type adjectives. Some examples not based on na are ikeru (生ける, "living"), arishi (在りし, "past"), konna (こんな, "such a"), and iwayuru (所謂, "so-called").

All i-adjectives except for ii (いい, good) have regular conjugations, and ii is irregular only in the fact that it is a changed form of the regular adjective yoi (良い) permissible in the terminal and attributive forms. For all other forms it reverts to yoi.

Stem forms for adjectives
	i-adjectives	na-adjectives
	yasu. (安・い)	shizuka- (静か-)
Irrealis form (未然形, mizenkei)	.karo (安かろ)	-daro (静かだろ)
Continuative form (連用形, ren'yōkei)	.ku (安く)	-de (静かで)
Terminal form¹ (終止形, shūshikei)	.i (安い)	-da (静かだ)
Attributive form¹ (連体形, rentaikei)	.i (安い)	-na (静かな)/ -naru (静かなる)
Hypothetical form (仮定形, kateikei)	.kere (安けれ)	-nara (静かなら)
Imperative form² (命令形, meireikei)	.kare (安かれ)	-nare (静かなれ)

1. The attributive and terminal forms were formerly .ki (安き) and .shi (安し), respectively; in modern Japanese these are used productively for stylistic reasons only, although many set phrases such as nanashi (名無し, anonymous) and yoshi (よし, [general positive interjection]; sometimes written yosh), derive from them.
2. The imperative form is extremely rare in modern Japanese, restricted to set patterns like osokare hayakare (遅かれ早かれ, 'sooner or later'), where they are treated as adverbial phrases. It is impossible for an imperative form to be in a predicate position.

Common conjugations of adjectives are enumerated below. ii is not treated separately, because all conjugation forms are identical to those of yoi.

	i-adjectives yasui (安い, "cheap")		na-adjectives shizuka (静か, "quiet")	
informal nonpast	root + -i (Used alone, without the copula)	yasui (安い, "is cheap")	root + copula da	shizuka da (静かだ, "is quiet")
informal past	cont. + atta (あった) (u + a collapse)	yasuk.atta (安かった, "was cheap")	cont. + atta (あった) (e + a collapse)	shizuka d.atta (静かだった, "was quiet")
informal negative nonpast	cont. + (wa) nai ((は)ない)¹	yasuku(wa)nai (安く(は)ない, "isn't cheap")	cont. + (wa) nai ((は)ない)	shizuka de (wa) nai (静かで(は)ない, "isn't quiet")
informal negative past	cont. + (wa) nakatta ((は)なかった)¹	yasuku(wa)nakatta (安く(は)なかった, "wasn't cheap")	cont. + (wa) nakatta ((は)なかった)	shizuka de (wa) nakatta (静かで(は)なかった, "wasn't quiet")
polite nonpast	root + -i + copula desu (です)	yasui desu (安いです, "is cheap")	root + copula desu (です)	shizuka desu (静かです, "is quiet")
polite negative nonpast	arimasen (ありません)¹	yasuku arimasen (安くありません)	inf. cont + (wa) arimasen ((は)ありません)	shizuka de wa arimasen (静かではありません)
polite negative nonpast	inf. neg. non-past + copula desu (です)¹	yasukunai desu (安くないです)	inf. cont + (wa) nai desu ((は)ないです)	shizuka de wa nai desu (静かではないです)
polite negative past	inf. cont + arimasen deshita (ありませんでした)	yasuku arimasen deshita (安くありませんでした)	inf. cont + (wa) arimasen deshita ((は)ありませんでした)	shizuka de wa arimasen deshita (静かではありませんでした)
polite negative past	inf. neg. past + copula desu (です)¹	yasukunakatta desu (安くなかったです)	inf. neg. past + nakatta desu (なかったです)¹	shizuka de wa nakatta desu (静かではなかったです)
-te form	cont. + te (て)	yasuku.te (安くて)	cont.	shizuka de (静かで)
provisional conditional	hyp. + ba (ば)	yasukere.ba (安ければ)	hyp. (+ ba (ば))	shizuka nara(ba) (静かなら(ば))
past conditional	inf. past + ra (ら)	yasukatta.ra (安かったら)	inf. past + ra (ら)	shizuka datta.ra (静かだったら)
volitional²	irrealis + u (う) /root + darō (だろう)	yasukarō (安かろう) / yasuidarō (安いだろう)	irrealis + u (う) = root + darō (だろう)	shizuka darō (静かだろう)
adverbial	cont.	yasuku. (安く)	root + ni (に)	shizuka ni (静かに)
degree (-ness)	root + sa (さ)	yasu-sa (安さ)	root + sa (さ)	shizuka-sa (静かさ)

1. Note that these are just forms of the i-type adjective nai (ない)
2. Since most adjectives describe non-volitional conditions, the volitional form is interpreted as "it is possible", if sensible. In some rare cases it is semi-volitional: yokarō (良かろう, 'OK'; lit: "let it be good") in response to a report or request.

Adjectives too are governed by euphonic rules in certain cases, as noted in the section on it below. For the polite negatives of na-type adjectives, see also the section below on the copula da (だ).

=== Copula (だ da) ===
The copula da behaves very much like a verb or an adjective in terms of conjugation.

Stem forms of the copula
Irrealis form (未然形, mizenkei)	de wa (では)
Continuative form (連用形, ren'yōkei)	de (で)
Terminal form (終止形, shūshikei)	da (だ; informal) desu (です; polite) de gozaimasu (でございます; respectful)
Attributive form (連体形, rentaikei)	de aru (である)
Hypothetical form (仮定形, kateikei)	nara (なら)
Imperative form (命令形, meireikei)	deare (であれ)

Note that there are no potential, causative, or passive forms of the copula, just as with adjectives.

The following are some examples.

ジョンは学生だ。

JON wa gakusei da

"John is a student."

明日も晴れなら、ピクニックしよう。

Ashita mo hare nara, PIKUNIKKU shiyō

"If tomorrow is clear too, let's have a picnic."

In continuative conjugations, de wa (では) is often contracted in speech to ja (じゃ); for some kinds of informal speech ja is preferable to de wa, or is the only possibility.

Conjugations of the copula
nonpast	informal	da (だ)	
nonpast	polite	desu (です)	
nonpast	respectful	de gozaimasu (でございます)	
past	informal	cont. + atta (あった) datta (だった)	
past	polite	deshita (でした)	
past	respectful	de gozaimashita (でございました)	
negative nonpast	informal	cont. + wa nai (はない)	ja nai (じゃない)
negative nonpast	polite	cont. + wa arimasen (はありません)	(じゃありません; ja arimasen)
negative nonpast	respectful	cont. + wa gozaimasen (はございません)	(じゃございません; ja gozaimasen)
negative past	informal	cont. + wa nakatta (はなかった)	ja nakatta (じゃなかった)
negative past	polite	cont. + wa arimasen deshita (はありませんでした)	ja arimasen deshita (じゃありませんでした)
negative past	respectful	cont. + wa gozaimasen deshita (はございませんでした)	ja gozaimasen deshita (じゃございませんでした)
conditional	informal	hyp. + ba (ば)	
conditional	polite	cont. + areba (あれば)	
conditional	respectful	cont. + areba (あれば)	
provisional	informal	nara (なら)	
provisional	polite	same as conditional	
provisional	respectful	same as conditional	
volitional	informal	darō (だろう)	
volitional	polite	deshō (でしょう)	
volitional	respectful	de gozaimashō (でございましょう)	
adverbial and -te forms	informal	cont.	
adverbial and -te forms	polite	cont. + arimashite (ありまして)	
adverbial and -te forms	respectful	cont. + gozaimashite (ございまして)	

=== Euphonic changes (音便, onbin) ===
==== Historical sound change ====
Spelling changes
Archaic	Modern
a + u (あ＋う) a + fu (あ＋ふ)	ō (おう)
i + u (い＋う) i + fu (い＋ふ)	yū (ゆう)^{1}
u + fu (う＋ふ)	ū (うう)
e + u (え＋う) e + fu (え＋ふ)	yō (よう)
o + fu (お＋ふ)	ō (おう)
o + ho (お＋ほ) o + wo (お＋を)	ō (おお)
auxiliary verb mu (む)	n (ん)
medial or final ha (は)	wa (わ)
medial or final hi (ひ), he (へ), ho (ほ)	i (い), e (え), o (お) (via wi, we, wo, see below)
any wi (ゐ), we (ゑ), wo (を)	i (い), e (え), o (お)^{1}

1. Usually not reflected in spelling

Modern pronunciation is a result of a long history of phonemic drift that can be traced back to written records of the 13th century, and possibly earlier. However, it was only in 1946 that the Japanese ministry of education modified existing kana usage to conform to the standard dialect (共通語, kyōtsūgo). All earlier texts used the archaic orthography, now referred to as historical kana usage. The adjoining table is a nearly exhaustive list of these spelling changes.

Note that the palatalized morae ゆ and よ (yu and yo) combine with the initial consonant (if present) yielding a palatalized syllable. The most basic example of this is modern kyō (今日（きょう）, today), which historically developed as kefu (けふ) → kyō (きょう), via the efu (えふ) → yō (よう) rule.

A few sound changes are not reflected in the spelling. Firstly, ou merged with oo, both being pronounced as a long ō. Secondly, the particles は and を are still written using historical kana usage, though these are pronounced as wa and o respectively, rather than ha and wo.

Among Japanese speakers, it is not generally understood that the historical kana spellings were, at one point, reflective of pronunciation. For example, the modern on'yomi reading yō (よう) (for leaf (葉, yō)) arose from the historical efu (えふ). The latter was pronounced something like [ʲepu] by the Japanese at the time it was borrowed (compare Middle Chinese [jiɛp̚]). However, a modern reader of a classical text would still read this as [joː], the modern pronunciation.

==== Verb conjugations ====
Conjugations of some verbs and adjectives differ from the prescribed formation rules because of euphonic changes. Nearly all of these euphonic changes are themselves regular. For verbs the exceptions are all in the ending of the continuative form of group when the following particle or auxiliary is derived from the ancient perfective auxiliary -tsu, including -te, -te ari → -tari → -ta. This is not the case with the unrelated desiderative auxiliaries -tashi → -tai and -tagaru, however.

Continuative ending	Changes to	Example
i (い), chi (ち) or ri (り)	っ (double consonant, sokuon, sokuonbin)	*kaite (＊買いて) → katte (買って) *uchite (＊打ちて) → utte (打って) *shirite (＊知りて) → shitte (知って)
bi (び), mi (み) or ni (に)	syllabic n (ん) (hatsuon, hatsuonbin), with the following t (タ) sound voiced	*asobite (＊遊びて) → asonde (遊んで) *sumite (＊住みて) → sunde (住んで) *shinite (＊死にて) → shinde (死んで)
ki (き)	i (い) (i-onbin)	*kakite (＊書きて) → kaite (書いて)
gi (ぎ)	i (い), with the following t (タ) sound voiced	*oyogite (＊泳ぎて) → oyoide (泳いで)

* denotes impossible/ungrammatical form.

There is one other irregular change: iku (行く, to go), for which there is an exceptional continuative form: iki (行き) + te (て) → itte (行って), iki (行き) + ta (た) → itta (行った), etc. The more literary and/or dialectal variant yuku (行く) is regular, hence yuite (行いて). Older forms such as iite and ite have been recorded in 16th-century Christian publications.

For verbs like kau (買う; 'buy'), iu (言う; 'say'), etc., there is a clear preference for sokuonbin in northern and eastern dialects, as in katte (買って), itte/yutte (言って); and for u-onbin in western and southern dialects, as in kōte (買うて), yūte (言うて). In standard Japanese (eastern), however, there are three exceptions where u-onbin is preferred, tōte (問うて; 'ask; inquire'), kōte (請うて・乞うて; 'ask; request') and kōte (恋うて; 'long for'). For these verbs, sokuonbin is rare, but not nonexistent, such as totte (問って)/totta (問った), kotte (請って・乞って)/kotta (請った・乞った) and kotte (恋って). (Note: The authenticity of this particular occurrence is rather dubious. The two other instances of 戀つて in this same edition are meant to be pronounced omotte rather than kotte. Where this edition has kotte (戀(こ)つて), others have shitatte (慕(した)つて) instead.) Forms such as itōte (厭うて), ōta (負うた), sōta (沿うた), notamōta (宣うた), tamōte (給うて) have been reported as well.

==== Polite forms of adjectives ====
The continuative form of proper adjectives, when followed by polite forms such as gozaru (ござる/御座る, be) or zonjiru (存じる, know, think), undergoes a transformation; this may be followed by historical sound changes, yielding a one-step or two-step sound change. Note that these verbs are almost invariably conjugated to polite -masu (〜ます) form, as gozaimasu (ございます) and zonjimasu (存じます) (note the irregular conjugation of gozaru, discussed below), and that these verbs are preceded by the continuative form – -ku (〜く) – of adjectives, rather than the terminal form – -i (〜い) – which is used before the more everyday desu (です, be).

The rule is -ku (〜く) → -u (〜う) (dropping the -k-), possibly also combining with the previous syllable according to the spelling reform chart, which may also undergo palatalization in the case of yu, yo (ゆ、よ).

Historically there were two classes of proper Old Japanese adjectives, -ku (〜く) and -shiku (〜しく) ("-ku adjective" means "not preceded by shi"). This distinction collapsed during the evolution of Late Middle Japanese adjectives, and both are now considered -i (〜い) adjectives. The sound change for -shii adjectives follows the same rule as for other -ii adjectives, notably that the preceding vowel also changes and the preceding mora undergoes palatalization, yielding -shiku (〜しく) → -shū (〜しゅう), though historically this was considered a separate but parallel rule.

Continuative ending	Changes to	Example
-aku (〜あく)	-ō (〜おう)	*ohayaku gozaimasu (＊おはやくございます) → ohayō gozaimasu (おはようございます)
-iku (〜いく)	-yū (〜ゆう)	*ōkiku gozaimasu (＊大きくございます) → ōkyū gozaimasu (大きゅうございます)
-uku (〜うく)	-ū (〜うう)	*samuku gozaimasu (＊寒くございます) → samū gozaimasu (寒うございます)
*-eku (＊〜えく)	*-yō (＊〜よう)	(not present)
-oku (〜おく)	-ō (〜おう)	*omoshiroku gozaimasu (＊面白くございます) → omoshirō gozaimasu (面白うございます)
-shiku (〜しく)	-shū (〜しゅう)	*suzushiku gozaimasu (＊涼しくございます) → suzushū gozaimasu (涼しゅうございます)

==== Respectful verbs ====
Respectful verbs such as kudasaru (くださる, 'to get'), nasaru (なさる, 'to do'), gozaru (ござる, 'to be'), irassharu (いらっしゃる, 'to be/come/go'), ossharu (おっしゃる, 'to say'), etc. behave like group 1 verbs, except in the continuative and imperative forms.

	Change	Example
continuative	-ri (〜り) changed to -i (〜い)	*gozarimasu (＊ござります) → gozaimasu (ございます) *irassharimase (＊いらっしゃりませ) → irasshaimase (いらっしゃいませ)
imperative	-re (〜れ) changed to -i (〜い)	*kudasare (＊くだされ) → kudasai (ください) *nasare (＊なされ) → nasai (なさい)

==== Colloquial contractions ====
In speech, common combinations of conjugation and auxiliary verbs are contracted in a fairly regular manner.

Colloquial contractions
Full form	Colloquial	Example
-te shimau (〜てしまう)	-chau/-chimau (〜ちゃう/-ちまう) group 1	負けて しまう → 負けちゃう / 負けちまう makete shimau {} makechau / makechimau 'lose'
-de shimau (〜でしまう)	-jau/-jimau (〜じゃう/〜じまう) group 1	死んで しまう → 死んじゃう / 死んじまう shinde shimau {} shinjau / shinjimau 'die'
-te wa (〜ては)	-cha (〜ちゃ)	食べて は いけない → 食べちゃ いけない tabete wa ikenai {} tabecha ikenai 'must not eat'
-de wa (〜では)	-ja (〜じゃ)	飲んで は いけない → 飲んじゃ いけない nonde wa ikenai {} nonja ikenai 'must not drink'
-te iru (〜ている)	-teru (〜てる) group 2b	寝て いる → 寝てる nete iru {} neteru 'is sleeping'
-te oku (〜ておく)	-toku (〜とく) group 1	して おく → しとく shite oku {} shitoku 'will do it so'
-te iku (〜て行く)	-teku (〜てく) group 1	出て 行け → 出てけ dete ike {} deteke 'get out!'
-te ageru (〜てあげる)	-tageru (〜たげる) group 2a	買って あげる → 買ったげる katte ageru {} kattageru 'buy something (for someone)'
-ru no (〜るの)	-nno (〜んの)	何 して いる の → 何 してんの nani shite iru no {} nani shitenno 'what are you doing?'
-rinasai (〜りなさい)	-nnasai (〜んなさい)	やりなさい → やんなさい yarinasai {} yannasai 'do it!'
-runa (〜るな)	-nna (〜んな)	やるな → やんな yaruna {} yanna 'don't do it!'
-re wa or -reba (〜れは or 〜れば)	-rya (〜りゃ)	どう すれば いい の だろう → どう すりゃ(あ） いいん だろう dou sureba ii no darou {} dou surya iin darou 'what should I do?'

There are occasional others, such as -aranai → -annai as in wakaranai (分からない, don't understand) → wakannai (分かんない) and tsumaranai (つまらない, boring) → tsumannai (つまんない) – these are considered quite casual and are more common among the younger generation.

Contractions differ by dialect, but behave similarly to the standard ones given above. For example, in the Kansai dialect, -te shimau (〜てしまう) → -temau (〜てまう).

== Other independent words ==
=== Adverbs ===
Adverbs in Japanese are not as tightly integrated into the morphology as in many other languages; adverbs are not an independent class of words, but the role of an adverb is played by other words. For example, every adjective in the continuative form can be used as an adverb; thus, yowai (弱い, 'weak' [adj]) → yowaku (弱く, 'weakly' [adv]). The primary distinguishing characteristic of adverbs is that they cannot occur in a predicate position, just as it is in English. The following classification of adverbs is not intended to be authoritative or exhaustive.

Verbal adverbs
verbs in the continuative form with the particle ni. E.g. miru (見る, 'to see') → mi ni (見に, 'for the purpose of seeing'), used for instance as: mi ni iku (見に行く, 'go to see (something)').
Adjectival adverbs
adjectives in the continuative form, as mentioned above. Example: yowai (弱い, 'weak' [adj]) → yowaku (弱く, 'weakly' [adv])
Nominal adverbs
grammatical nouns that function as adverbs. Example: ichiban (一番, 'most highly').
Sound symbolism
words that mimic sounds or concepts. Examples: kirakira (きらきら, 'sparklingly'), pokkuri (ぽっくり, 'suddenly'), surusuru (するする, 'smoothly' (sliding)), etc.

Often, especially for sound symbolism, the particle to (と, 'as if') is used. See the article on Japanese sound symbolism.

=== Conjunctions and interjections ===
Although called "conjunctions", conjunctions in Japanese are – as their English translations show – actually a kind of adverb:

Examples of conjunctions: soshite (そして, 'and then'), mata (また, 'and then/again'), etc.

Interjections in Japanese differ little in use and translation from interjections in English:

Examples of interjections: hai (はい, yes/OK/uh), hē (へえ, wow!), iie (いいえ, no/no way), oi (おい, hey!), etc.

== Ancillary words ==
=== Particles ===
Particles in Japanese are postpositional, as they immediately follow the modified component. Both the pronunciation and spelling differs for the particles wa (は), e (へ) and o (を), and are romanized according to pronunciation rather than spelling. Only a few prominent particles are listed here.

==== Topic, theme, and subject: は wa and が ga ====
The complex distinction between the so-called topic, wa (は), and subject, ga (が), particles can often be confusing for second-language learners and students of Japanese. The clause zō-wa hana-ga nagai (象は鼻が長い) is well known for appearing to contain two subjects. It does not simply mean "the elephant's nose is long", as that can be translated as zō-no hana-wa nagai (象の鼻は長い). Rather, a more literal translation would be "(speaking of) the elephant, its nose is long"; furthermore, as Japanese does not distinguish between singular and plural the way English does, it could also mean "as for elephants, their noses are long".

Two major scholarly surveys of Japanese linguistics in English, clarify the distinction. To simplify matters, the referents of wa and ga in this section are called the topic and subject respectively, with the understanding that if either is absent, the grammatical topic and subject may coincide.

As an abstract and rough approximation, the difference between wa and ga is a matter of focus: wa gives focus to the action of the sentence, i.e., to the verb or adjective, whereas ga gives focus to the subject of the action. However, when first being introduced to the topic and subject markers wa and ga, most are told that the difference between the two is simpler. The topic marker, wa, is used to declare or to make a statement. The subject marker, ga, is used for new information, or asking for new information.

===== Thematic wa =====
The use of wa to introduce a new theme of discourse is directly linked to the notion of grammatical theme. Opinions differ on the structure of discourse theme, though it seems fairly uncontroversial to imagine a first-in-first-out hierarchy of themes that is threaded through the discourse. However, the usage of this understanding of themes can be limiting when speaking of their scope and depth, and the introduction of later themes may cause earlier themes to expire. In these sorts of sentences, the steadfast translation into English uses constructs like "speaking of X" or "on the topic of X", though such translations tend to be bulky as they fail to use the thematic mechanisms of English. For lack of a comprehensive strategy, many teachers of Japanese emphasize the "speaking of X" pattern without sufficient warning.

ジョン は 学生 です。
JON wa gakusei desu
(On the topic of) John, (he) is a student.

A common linguistic joke shows the insufficiency of rote translation with the sentence boku wa unagi da (僕はウナギだ), which per the pattern would translate as "I am an eel" (or "(As of) me is eel"). Yet, in a restaurant this sentence can reasonably be used to say "My order is eel" (or "I would like to order an eel"), with no intended humour. This is because the sentence should be literally read, "As for me, it is an eel," with "it" referring to the speaker's order. The topic of the sentence is clearly not its subject.

===== Contrastive wa =====
Related to the role of wa in introducing themes is its use in contrasting the current topic and its aspects from other possible topics and their aspects. The suggestive pattern is "X, but…" or "as for X, …".

雨 は 降って います が…
ame wa futte imasu ga…
The rain is falling, but…

Because of its contrastive nature, the topic cannot be undefined.

＊誰か は 本 を 読んで いる。
*dareka wa hon o yonde iru
*Someone is reading the book.

In this use, ga is required.

In practice, the distinction between thematic and contrastive wa is not that useful. There can be at most one thematic wa in a sentence, and it has to be the first wa if one exists, and the remaining was are contrastive. The following sentence illustrates the difference;

僕 が 知って いる 人 は 誰も 来なかった。
boku ga shitte iru hito wa daremo konakatta
(1) Of all the people I know, none came.
(2) (People came but), there weren't any of the people I know.

The first interpretation is the thematic wa, treating "the people I know" (boku ga shitte iru hito) as the theme of the predicate "none came" (dare mo konakatta). That is, if the speaker knows A, B, ..., Z, then none of the people who came were A, B, ..., Z. The second interpretation is the contrastive wa. If the likely attendees were A, B, ..., Z, and of them the speaker knows P, Q and R, then the sentence says that P, Q and R did not come. The sentence says nothing about A', B', ..., Z', all of whom the speaker knows, but none of whom were likely to come. In practice, the first interpretation is the likely one.

===== Exhaustive ga =====
Unlike wa, the subject particle ga nominates its referent as the sole satisfier of the predicate. This distinction is famously illustrated by the following pair of sentences:

ジョンさん は 学生 です。
Jon-san wa gakusei desu
John is a student. (There may be other students among the people we're talking about.)

(この グループ の 中 で) ジョン が 学生 です。
(Kono gurūpu no naka de) Jon ga gakusei desu
(Of all the people we are talking about) it is John who is the student.

The distinction between each example sentence may be made easier to understand if thought of in terms of the question each statement could answer. The first example sentence could answer the question:

ジョンさん の 仕事 は 何 です か。
Jon-san no shigoto wa nan desu ka
What is John's occupation?

Whereas the second example sentence could answer the question:

どちら の 方 が 学生 です か。
Dochira no kata ga gakusei desu ka
Which one (of them) is the student?

Similarly, in a restaurant, if asked by the waitstaff who has ordered the eels, the customer who ordered it could say:

僕 が ウナギ だ。
Boku ga unagi da
The eels are for me (not these other people).

===== Objective ga =====
For certain verbs, ga is typically used instead of o to mark what would be the direct object in English:

ジョンさん は フランス語 が 出来る。
Jon-san wa furansu-go ga dekiru
John knows French.

There are various common expressions that use verbs in English, often transitive verbs, where the action happens to a specific object: "to be able to do something", "to want something", "to like something", "to dislike something". These same ideas are expressed in Japanese using adjectives and intransitive verbs that describe a subject, instead of actions that happen to an object: "to be possible" (出来る, dekiru), "to be desired/desirable" (ほしい, hoshii), "to be liked" (好きだ, suki da), "to be disliked" (嫌いだ, kirai da). The equivalent of the English subject is instead the topic in Japanese and thus marked by wa, reflecting the topic-prominent nature of Japanese grammar.

Since these constructions in English describe an object, whereas the Japanese equivalents describe a subject marked with ga (が), some sources call this usage of ga (が) the "objective ga". Strictly speaking, this label may be misleading, as there is no object in the Japanese constructions.

As an example, the Japanese verb wakaru (分かる) is often glossed as transitive English verb "to understand". However, wakaru is an intransitive verb that describes a subject, so a more literal gloss would be "to be understandable".

ジョンさん は 日本語 が 分かる。
Jon-san wa nihongo ga wakaru.
* John understands Japanese. → translating into idiomatic English, using the transitive verb "to understand"
* As for John, Japanese is understandable. → translating more closely to the Japanese, with "Japanese" as the subject of an intransitive descriptive verb

==== Objects, locatives, instrumentals: を o, で de, に ni, へ e ====
The direct object of transitive verbs is indicated by the object particle o (を).

ジョンさん は 青い セーター を 着て いる。
Jon-san wa aoi sētā o kite iru
John is wearing a blue sweater.

This particle can also mean "through" or "along" or "out of" when used with motion verbs:

メアリ が 細い 道 を 歩いて いた。
MEARI ga hosoi michi o aruite ita
Mary was walking along a narrow road.

国境 の 長い トンネル を 抜ける と 雪国 で あった。
kokkyō no nagai TONNERU o nukeru to yukiguni de atta
(The train) came out of the long border tunnel into the snow country.

The general instrumental particle is de (で), which can be translated as "using" or "by":

肉 は ナイフ で 切る こと。
niku wa NAIFU de kiru koto
Meat must be cut with a knife.

電車 で 行きましょう。
densha de ikimashō
Let's go by train.

This particle also has other uses: "at" (temporary location):

町角 で 先生 に 会った。
machikado de sensei ni atta
(I) met my teacher at the street corner.

"In":

海 で 泳ぐ の は 難しい。
umi de oyogu no wa muzukashii
Swimming in the sea is hard.

"With" or "in (the span of)":

劇 は 主人公 の 死 で 終る。
geki wa shujinkō no shi de owaru
The play ends with the protagonist's death.

俺 は 二秒 で 勝つ。
ore wa nibyō de katsu
I'll win in two seconds.

The general locative particle is ni (に).

東京 に 行きましょう。
Tōkyō ni ikimashō
Let's go to Tokyo.

In this function it is interchangeable with e (へ). However, ni has additional uses: "at (prolonged)":

私 は 大手町 一丁目 99 番地 に 住んで います。
watashi wa Ōtemachi itchōme 99 banchi ni sunde imasu
I live at Ōtemachi ichōme 99 banchi.

"On":

氷 は 水 に 浮く。
kōri wa mizu ni uku
Ice floats on water.

"In (some year)", "at (some point in time)":

春 の 夕暮れ に……
haru no yūgure ni…
On a spring eve…

==== Quantity and extents: と to, も mo, か ka, や ya, から kara, まで made ====
To conjoin nouns, と to is used.

かばん に は、 教科書 三冊 と 漫画本 五冊 を 入れて います。
Kaban ni wa kyōkasho san-satsu to manga-bon go-satsu o irete imasu
I have three textbooks and five comic books in the bag.

The additive particle mo (も) can be used to conjoin larger nominals and clauses.

ヨハン は ドイツ人 だ。 ブリゲッタ も ドイツ人 だ。
YOHAN wa DOITSU-jin da. BURIGETTA mo DOITSU-jin da
Johann is a German. Brigitte is a German too.

彼 は 映画 スター で あり、 政治家 で も ある。
kare wa eiga SUTĀ de ari, seijika de mo aru
He is a movie star and also a politician.

For an incomplete list of conjuncts, ya (や) is used.

ボリス や イワン を 呼べ。
BORISU ya IWAN o yobe
Call Boris, Ivan, etc.

When only one of the conjuncts is necessary, the disjunctive particle ka (か) is used.

寿司 か 刺身 か、 何か 注文 して ね。
sushi ka sashimi ka, nanika chūmon shite ne
Please order sushi or sashimi or something.

Quantities are listed between 'from' (から, kara) and 'to' (まで, made).

華氏 92 度 から 96 度 まで の 熱 は 心配 する もの で は ない。
Kashi 92 do kara 96 do made no netsu wa shinpai suru mono de wa nai
A temperature between 92 Fahrenheit and 96 is not worrisome.

This pair can also be used to indicate time or space.

朝9時(午前9時)から11時まで授業があるんだ。
asa ku-ji kara jūichi-ji made jugyō ga aru n da
You see, I have classes between 9 a.m. and 11 a.m.

Because kara indicates starting point or origin, it has a related use as "because", analogously to English "since" (in the sense of both "from" and "because"):

スミスさん は とても 積極的 な 人 です から、 いつも 全部 頼まれて いる の かもしれません。
SUMISU-san wa totemo sekkyokuteki na hito desu kara, itsumo zenbu tanomarete iru no kamoshiremasen
Mr. Smith, because you're so assertive, you may always be asked to do everything.

The particle kara and a related particle yori are used to indicate lowest extents: prices, business hours, etc.

私たち の 店 は 7時 より 営業 して おります。
Watashitachi no mise wa shichi-ji yori eigyō shite orimasu
Our shop is open for business from 7 onwards.

Yori is also used in the sense of "than".

お前 は 姉ちゃん より うるさい ん だ!
omae wa nē-chan yori urusai n da
You are louder/more talkative than my elder sister!

==== Coordinating: と to, に ni, よ yo ====
The particle to (と) is used to set off quotations.

「殺して… 殺して」 と あの 子 は 言っていた。
"koroshite… koroshite" to ano ko wa itteita
The girl was saying, "Kill me… kill me."

猫 が ニャー ニャー と 鳴く。
neko ga NYĀ NYĀ to naku
The cat says meow, meow.

It is also used to indicate a manner of similarity, "as if", "like" or "the way".

彼 は 「愛してる よ」 と 言って、 ぽっくり と 死んだ。
kare wa "aishiteru yo" to itte, pokkuri to shinda
He said "I love you," and dropped dead.

In a related conditional use, it functions like "after/when", or "upon".

雨 が 上がる と、 子ども達 は 授業 を 忘れて、 日 の 当たっている 水たまり の 誘惑 に 夢中 に なる。
ame ga agaru to, kodomo-tachi wa jugyō o wasurete, hi no atatteiru mizutamari no yūwaku ni muchū ni naru
Rain stops and then: children, forgetting their lessons, give in to the temptation of sun-faced puddles.

国境 の 長い トンネル を 抜ける と 雪国 で あった。
kokkyō no nagai TONNERU o nukeru to, yukiguni de atta
(The train) came out of the long border tunnel (and then) into the snow country.

Finally it is used with verbs like to meet (with) (会う, au) or to speak (with) (話す, hanasu).

ジョン が メアリー と 初めて 会った の は、 1942 年 の 春 の 夕暮れ時 の こと だった。
JON ga MEARI to hajimete atta no wa, 1942 nen no haru no yūguredoki no koto datta
John met Mary for the first time on a dusky afternoon of spring in 1942.

This last use is also a function of the particle ni (に), but to indicates reciprocation which ni does not.

ジョンはメアリーと恋愛している。(usually say ジョンはメアリーと付き合っている。)
JON wa MEARI[II] to ren'ai shite iru (JON wa MEARI[II] to tsukiatte iru)
John and Mary are in love.

ジョンはメアリーに恋愛している。(usually say ジョンはメアリーに恋している。)
JON wa MEARI[II] ni ren'ai shite iru (JON wa MEARI[II] ni koi shite iru)
John loves Mary (but Mary might not love John back).

Finally, the particle yo (よ) is used in a hortative or vocative sense.

可愛い 娘 よ、 私 に 顔 を しかめるな。
kawaii musume yo, watashi ni kao o shikameruna
Oh my beloved daughter, don't frown at me so!

==== Final: か ka, ね ne, よ yo and related ====
The sentence-final particle ka (か) turns a declarative sentence into a question.

そちら は アメリカ人 でしょう か?
sochira wa amerika-jin deshō ka?
Are you perchance an American?

Other sentence-final particles add emotional or emphatic impact to the sentence. The particle ne (ね) softens a declarative sentence, similar to English "you know?", "eh?", "I tell you!", "isn't it?", "aren't you?", etc.

彼 に 電話 しなかった の ね。
kare ni denwa shinakatta no ne
You didn't call him up, did you?

近々 ロンドン に 引っ越される そう です ね。
chikajika rondon ni hikkosareru sō desu ne.
I hear you're moving to London soon. Is that true?

A final yo (よ) is used in order to soften insistence, warning or command, which would sound very strong without any final particles.

嘘 なんか ついて ない よ！
uso nanka tsuite nai yo!
I'm not lying!

There are many such emphatic particles; some examples: ze (ぜ) and zo (ぞ) usually used by males; na (な) a less formal form of ne; wa (わ) used like yo by females (and males in the Kansai region), etc. They are essentially limited to speech or transcribed dialogue.

==== Compound particles ====
Compound particles are formed with at least one particle together with other words, including other particles. The commonly seen forms are:

- particle + verb (term. or cont. or -te form)
- particle + noun + particle
- noun + particle

Other structures are rarer, though possible. A few examples:

その 件 に 関して 知っている 限り の こと を 教えて もらいたい。
sono ken ni kan-shite shitte-iru kagiri no koto o oshiete moraitai
Kindly tell me everything you know concerning that case. (particle + verb in cont.)

外国語 を 学習 する 上 で 大切 な こと は 毎日 の 努力 が もの を 言う と いう こと で ある。
gaikokugo o gakushū suru ue de taisetsu na koto wa mainichi no doryoku ga mono o iu to iu koto de aru
In studying a foreign language, daily effort gives the most rewards. (noun + particle)

兄 は 両親 の 心配 を よそ に、 大学 を やめて しまった。
ani wa ryōshin no shinpai o yoso ni, daigaku o yamete shimatta
Ignoring my parents' worries, my brother dropped out of college. (particle + noun + particle)

=== Auxiliary verbs ===
All auxiliary verbs attach to a verbal or adjectival stem form and conjugate as verbs. In modern Japanese there are two distinct classes of auxiliary verbs:

Pure auxiliaries (助動詞, jodōshi)
are usually just called verb endings or conjugated forms. These auxiliaries do not function as independent verbs.
Helper auxiliaries (補助動詞, hojodōshi)
are normal verbs that lose their independent meaning when used as auxiliaries.

In classical Japanese, which was more heavily agglutinating than modern Japanese, the category of auxiliary verb included every verbal ending after the stem form, and most of these endings were themselves inflected. In modern Japanese, however, some of them have stopped being productive. The prime example is the classical auxiliary -tari (たり), whose modern forms -ta (た) and -te (て) are no longer viewed as inflections of the same suffix, and can take no further affixes.

Some pure auxiliary verbs
auxiliary	group	attaches to	meaning modification	example
masu (ます)	irregular^{1}	continuative	makes the sentence polite	kaku (書く, 'to write') → kakimasu (書きます)
rareru (られる)^{2}	2b	irrealis of grp. 2	makes V passive/honorific/potential	miru (見る, 'to see') → mirareru (見られる, 'to be able to see') taberu (食べる, 'to eat') → taberareru (食べられる, 'to be able to eat')
reru (れる)	2b	irrealis of grp. 1	makes V passive/honorific	nomu (飲む, 'to drink/swallow') → nomareru (飲まれる, 'to be drunk') (Passive form of drink, not a synonym for intoxicated.)
saseru (させる)^{3}	2b	irrealis of grp. 2	makes V causative	kangaeru (考える, 'to think') → kangaesaseru (考えさせる, 'to cause to think')
seru (せる)	2b	irrealis of grp. 1	makes V causative	omoishiru (思い知る, 'to realize') → omoishiraseru (思い知らせる, 'to cause to realize/to teach a lesson')

1. masu (ます) has stem forms: irrealis ませ and ましょ, continuative まし, terminal ます, attributive ます, hypothetical ますれ, imperative ませ.
2. rareru (られる) in potential usage is sometimes shortened to reru (れる) (group 2); thus tabereru (食べれる, 'to be able to eat') instead of taberareru (食べられる). However, it is considered non-standard.
3. saseru (させる) is sometimes shortened to sasu (さす) (group 1), but this usage is somewhat literary.

Much of the agglutinative flavour of Japanese stems from helper auxiliaries, however. The following table contains a small selection of many such auxiliary verbs.

Some helper auxiliary verbs
auxiliary	group	attaches to	meaning modification	example
aru (ある, 'to be' [inanimate])	1	-te form only for trans.	indicates state modification	hiraku (開く, 'to open') → hiraite-aru (開いてある, 'opened and is still open')
iru (いる, 'to be' [animate])	2a	-te form for trans.	progressive aspect	neru (寝る, 'to sleep') → nete-iru (寝ている, 'is sleeping')
iru (いる, 'to be' [animate])	2a	-te form for intrans.	indicates state modification	shimaru (閉まる, 'to close (intransitive)') → shimatte-iru (閉まっている, 'is closed')
oku (おく, 'to put/place')	1	-te form	"do something in advance"	taberu (食べる, 'to eat') → tabete-oku (食べておく, 'eat in advance')
oku (おく, 'to put/place')	1	-te form	"keep"	akeru (開ける, 'to open') → akete-oku (開けておく, 'keep it open')
iku (行く, 'to go')	1	-te form	"goes on V-ing"	aruku (歩く, 'to walk') → aruite-iku (歩いて行く, 'keep walking')
kuru (くる, 'to come')	ka	-te form	inception, "start to V"	furu (降る, 'fall') → futte-kuru (降ってくる, 'start to fall')
kuru (くる, 'to come')	ka	-te form	perfection, "have V-ed" (only past-tense)	ikiru (生きる, 'live') → ikite-kita (生きてきた, 'have lived')
kuru (くる, 'to come')	ka	-te form	conclusion, "come to V"	kotonaru (異なる, 'differ') → kotonatte-kuru (異なってくる, 'come to differ')
hajimeru (始める, 'to begin')	2b	continuative non-punctual	"V begins", "begin to V"	kaku (書く, 'to write') → kaki-hajimeru (書き始める, 'start to write')
hajimeru (始める, 'to begin')	2b	continuative punctual & subj. must be plural	"V begins", "begin to V"	tsuku (着く, 'to arrive') → tsuki-hajimeru (着き始める, 'have all started to arrive')
dasu (出す, 'to emit')	1	continuative	"start to V"	kagayaku (輝く, 'to shine') → kagayaki-dasu (輝き出す, 'to start shining')
miru (みる, 'to see')	1	-te form	"try to V"	suru (する, 'do') → shite-miru (してみる, 'try to do')
naosu (なおす, 'to correct/heal')	1	continuative	"do V again, correcting mistakes"	kaku (書く, 'to write') → kaki-naosu (書きなおす, 'rewrite')
agaru (あがる, 'to rise')	1	continuative	"do V thoroughly" / "V happens upwards"	tatsu (立つ, 'to stand') → tachi-agaru (立ち上がる, 'stand up') dekiru (出来る, 'to come out') → deki-agaru (出来上がる, 'be completed')
eru/uru (得る, 'to be able')	(see note at bottom)	continuative	indicates potential	aru (ある, 'to be') → ariuru (あり得る, 'is possible')
kakaru/kakeru (かかる・かける, 'to hang/catch/obtain')	1	continuative only for intrans., non-volit.	"about to V", "almost V", "to start to V"	oboreru (溺れる, 'drown') → obore-kakeru (溺れかける, 'about to drown')
kiru (きる, 'to cut')	1	continuative	"do V completely"	taberu (食べる, 'to eat') → tabe-kiru (食べきる, 'to eat it all')
kesu (消す, 'to erase')	1	continuative	"cancel by V" "deny with V"	momu (揉む, 'to rub') → momi-kesu (揉み消す, 'to rub out, to extinguish')
komu (込む, 'to enter deeply/plunge')	1	continuative	"V deep in", "V into"	hanasu (話す, 'to speak') → hanashi-komu (話し込む, 'to be deep in conversation')
sageru (下げる, 'to lower')	2b	continuative	"V down"	hiku (引く, 'to pull') → hiki-sageru (引き下げる, 'to pull down')
sugiru (過ぎる, 'to exceed')	2a	continuative	"overdo V"	iu (言う, 'to say') → ii-sugiru (言いすぎる, 'to say too much, to overstate')
tsukeru (付ける, 'to attach')	2b	continuative	"become accustomed to V"	iku (行く, 'to go') → iki-tsukeru (行き付ける, 'be used to (going)')
tsuzukeru (続ける, 'to continue')	2b	continuative	"keep on V"	furu (降る, 'to fall') (e.g. rain) → furi-tsuzukeru (降り続ける, 'to keep falling')
tōsu (通す, 'to show/thread/lead')	1	continuative	"finish V-ing"	yomu (読む, 'to read') → yomi-tōsu (読み通す, 'to finish reading')
nukeru (抜ける, 'to shed/spill/desert')	2b	continuative only for intrans.	"V through"	hashiru (走る, 'to run') → hashiri-nukeru (走り抜ける, 'to run through')
nokosu (残す, 'to leave behind')	1	continuative	"by doing V, leave something behind"	omou (思う, 'to think') → omoi-nokosu (思い残す, 'to regret'; lit: to have something left to think about)
nokoru (残る, 'to be left behind')	1	continuative only for intrans.	"be left behind, doing V"	ikiru (生きる, 'live') → iki-nokoru (生き残る, 'to survive'; lit: to be left alive)
wakeru (分ける, 'to divide/split/classify')	2b	continuative	"the proper way to V"	tsukau (使う, 'use') → tsukai-wakeru (使い分ける, 'to indicate the proper way to use')
wasureru (忘れる, 'to forget')	2b	continuative	"to forget to V"	kiku (聞く, 'to ask') → kiki-wasureru (聞き忘れる, 'to forget to ask')
au (合う) 'to come together'	1	continuative	"to do V to each other", "to do V together"	daku (抱く, 'to hug') → daki-au (抱き合う, 'to hug each other')

- Note: eru/uru (得る) is the only modern verb of shimo nidan type (and it is different from the shimo nidan type of classical Japanese), with conjugations: irrealis え, continuative え, terminal える or うる, attributive うる, hypothetical うれ, imperative えろ or えよ.
