= Japanese: The Spoken Language =

Book by Eleanor Harz Jorden and Mari Noda

- Book 1
- Author: Eleanor Harz Jorden, Mari Noda
- Language: English
- Genre: Japanese textbook
- Publisher: Yale University Press
- Publication date: 1987 (Books 1 and 2), 1989 (Book 3)
- Publication place: United States
- Media type: Print (Paperback)
- ISBN: 978-0-300-03834-7

Japanese: The Spoken Language (JSL) is an introductory textbook series for learning Japanese. JSL was written by Eleanor Harz Jorden in collaboration with Mari Noda. Part 1 was published in 1987 by Yale Language Press, Part 2 in 1988, and Part 3 in 1990. The series differs from most Japanese language textbooks in many ways, most basically in that it focuses exclusively on the spoken language and leaves discussion of any aspect of the written language to other textbooks, such as the parallel series Japanese: The Written Language (JWL).

The approach is based on Jorden's decades of experience in teaching Japanese and pedagogical research, and was preceded by her 1960s textbook, Beginning Japanese, which JSL supersedes.

== Features ==
Beyond the focus on the spoken language alone, the text has a number of unusual features.

The text is centered on a sequence of dialogs and grammar drills, which are practiced and memorized, and detailed linguistic analysis of Japanese grammar. Vocabulary is taught in the context of these dialogs, rather than as isolated lists. This approach – dialogs and pattern practice – is heavily influenced by the audio-lingual method (ALM), which has since fallen out of favor, though the text is not strictly speaking an ALM text, providing grammar explanations rather than only memorization, for instance.

The terminology is at times non-standard – for example, 形容動詞 are referred to as na-nominals, as they behave grammatically almost identically to 名詞 (nouns), which are clearly nominals. This choice has some support in Japanese scholarship, though traditionally these words are referred to as "na-adjectives" or "adjectival nouns". Similarly, the gender differences in spoken Japanese are referred to as blunt/gentle, rather than male/female.

Another example of grammatically correct but non-standard pedagogical choices is that Japanese adjectives are translated not to English adjectives, but to English predicates, as this is how they function grammatically in Japanese when not preceding a noun. For example, 小さい (chiisai) is translated as "is small", rather than simply "small". (For adjectives preceding a noun, this choice of translation would naturally be inaccurate.)

The book is written exclusively in romaji, making no use of kana or kanji, though kana plus kanji text is available as supplementary texts. The form of romaji used is based closely on the Nihon-shiki form of romanization (which is often used in Japan), but which differs from Hepburn romanization, which is more commonly used in English-speaking countries. The romanization system attempts to follow the Japanese syllable structure to simplify grammatical relationships, rather than attempting to represent the sound. For example, ち is represented by "ti", as it falls into the たちつてと "t-" series, which is uniformly represented in JSL as ta/ti/tu/te/to, though ち is pronounced closer to English "chi" (as in "cheese"), rather than "ti" (as in "tee" or "tea"); in Hepburn these are represented as ta/chi/tsu/te/to, which are phonetically more suggestive (following standard English orthography), but obscure the Japanese syllable structure. In JSL, the text is intended only as a reference, not a guide to pronunciation, with the audio instead being the pronunciation guide.

Another uncommon feature of the text is that it emphasizes Japanese pitch accent in the words, according to standard Japanese.
