= Ōtsuki Fumihiko =

Japanese lexicographer, linguist, and historian

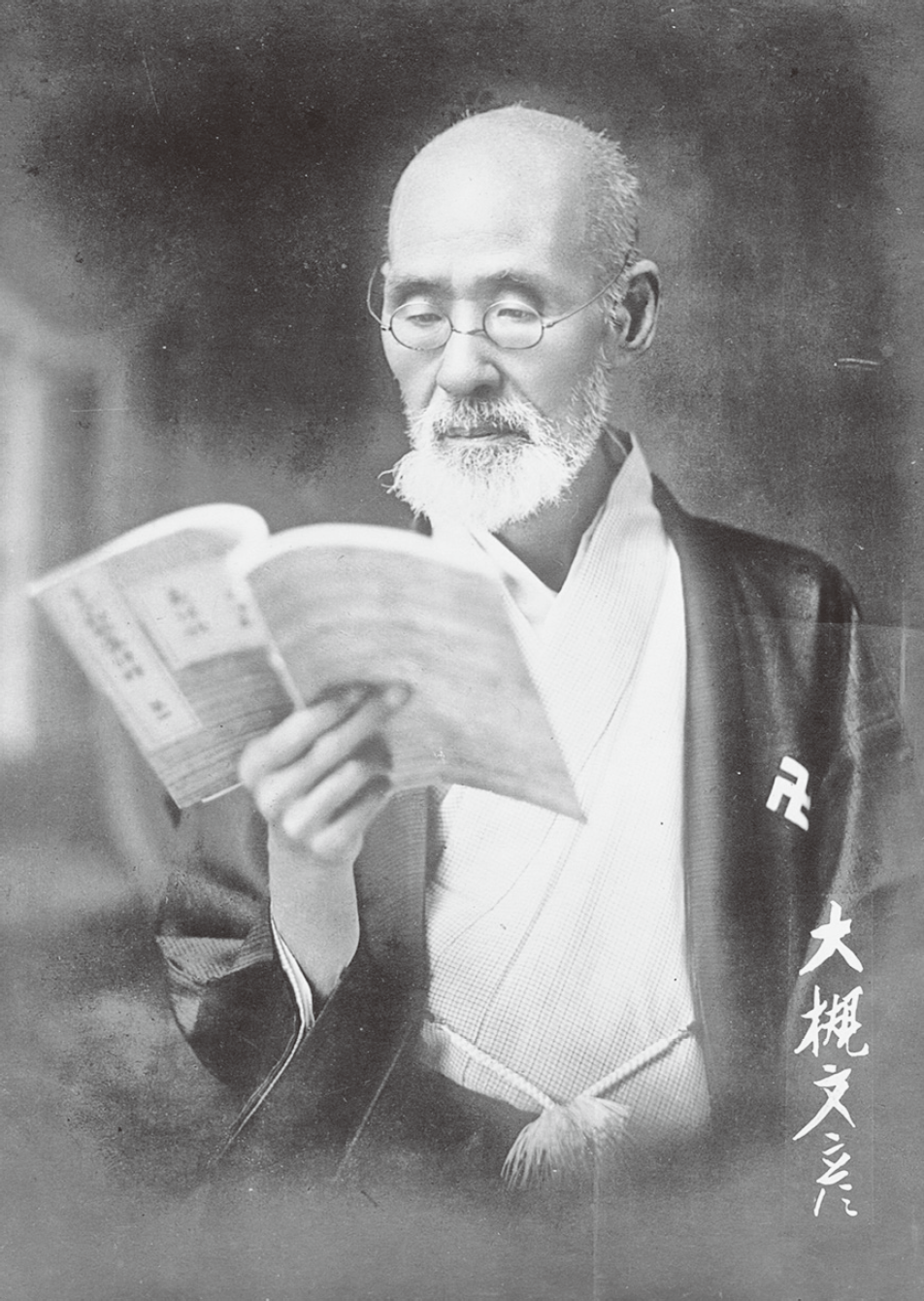
- Ōtsuki Fumihiko
- Born: December 22, 1847; Tokyo, Japan
- Died: February 17, 1928 (aged 80); Tokyo, Japan
- Occupations: Linguist, Lexicographer

Ōtsuki Fumihiko (大槻 文彦; Japanese pronunciation: [ɸɯ.mʲiꜜ.çi̥.ko], December 22, 1847 – February 17, 1928) was a Japanese lexicographer, linguist, and historian. He is best known for two Japanese-language dictionaries that he edited, Genkai (言海, "sea of words", 1891) and its successor Daigenkai (大言海, "great sea of words", 1932–1937), and for his studies of Japanese grammar.

== Biography ==
Ōtsuki Fumihiko was born in the Kobiki-chō (木挽町) section of Edo in what is now part of Ginza, Tokyo. He was the third son of the Confucian scholar and gunnery expert Ōtsuki Bankei (大槻磐渓) and the grandson of the Confucian and Western scholar Ōtsuki Gentaku (大槻玄沢). Following family tradition, he embarked on Western studies, studying English and mathematics at the Kaiseijo school (one of the predecessors of the University of Tokyo).

As a youth, Ōtsuki was employed as an advisor to Sendai Domain, and fought at the Battle of Toba–Fushimi in the Boshin War of the Meiji Restoration on the losing Tokugawa Bakufu side. He later assisted in the formation of the Ōuetsu Reppan Dōmei. After the Meiji Restoration, he worked as a translator while learning English from Americans in the port city of Yokohama. Around 1872, he joined in the editing of an English–Japanese dictionary for the Ministry of Education, and he later worked on textbooks and taught at schools in Miyagi Prefecture.

Although Ōtsuki paid for the original publication expenses for Genkai himself, it was soon republished and expanded in commercial editions that went through over a thousand printings. Modeled in part on Western monolingual dictionaries, Genkai gave not only basic information about words—their representations in kana and kanji and their definitions in Japanese—but also pronunciations and etymologies and citations of their use. Its successor, the four-volume Daigenkai, though published under Ōtsuki's name and based in part on his work, appeared some years after his death and was completed by other lexicographers.

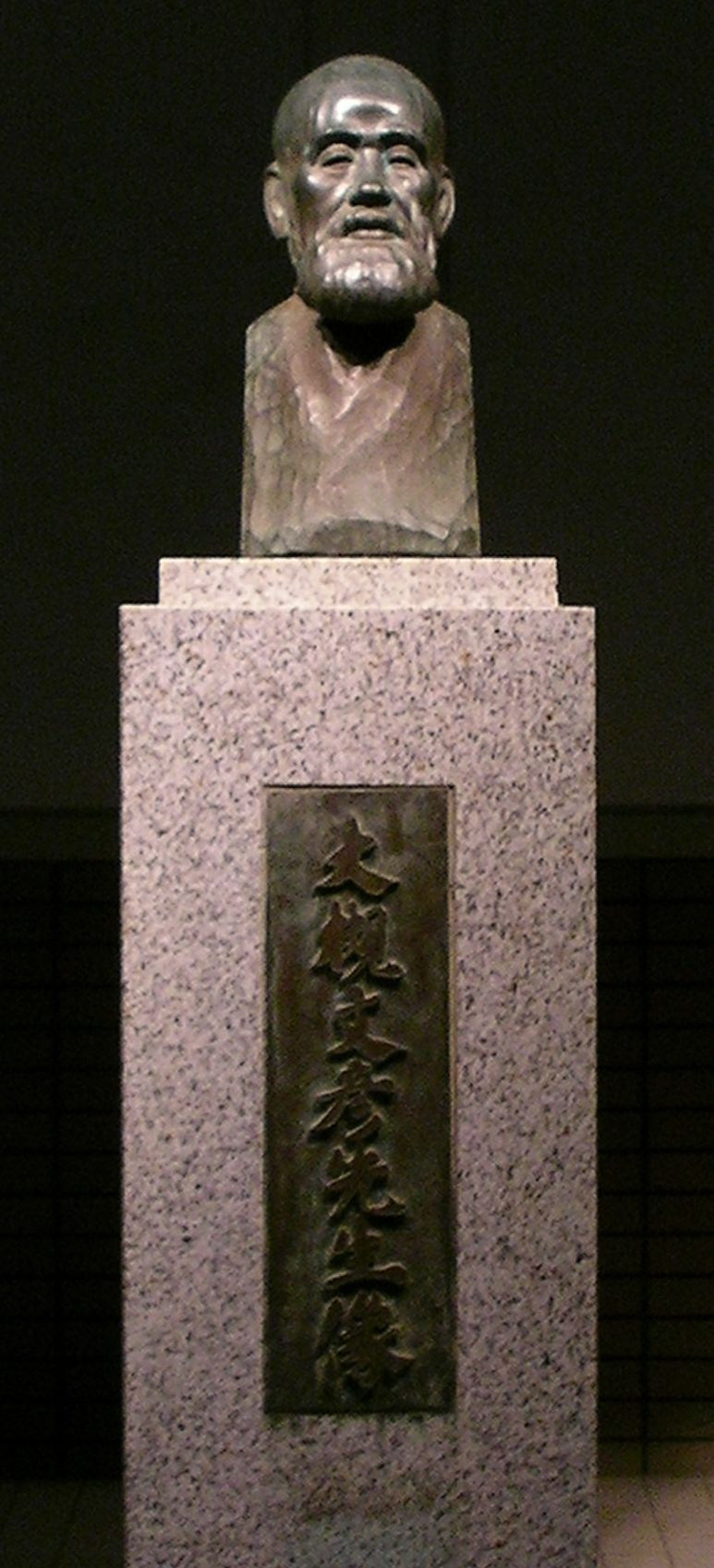
Bust of Ōtsuki Fumihiko at Sendai Dai-Ichi Elementary School, Miyagi Prefecture

Ōtsuki's grammatical works, especially A Comprehensive Japanese Grammar (広日本文典, Kō Nihon Bunten) and The Grammar of Spoken Japanese (口語法, Kōgohō), strongly influenced the teaching of Japanese grammar for generations to come.
