= Eleanor Jorden =

American linguist and Japanese language educator

Eleanor Jorden with her husband, William J. Jorden, and the couple's son, W. Temple, in Berlin in 1956

Eleanor Harz Jorden (December 28, 1920 – February 18, 2009) was an American linguistics scholar and an influential Japanese language educator and expert. Born Eleanor Harz, she married William Jorden, reporter and diplomat; the marriage ended in divorce.

Jorden earned her Ph.D. at Yale University under the direction of Bernard Bloch in 1950. She was best known for her seminal textbooks on the Japanese language, including Beginning Japanese and Japanese: The Spoken Language. The latter text included Jorden's JSL system of rōmaji for transcribing Japanese into Roman script. Her explanations of the subtleties of Japanese grammar and usage are still widely referenced today.

Jorden taught Japanese at many educational institutions, including Cornell University, Bryn Mawr College, Johns Hopkins University, Williams College, the University of Hawaii, International Christian University in Tokyo and Ohio State University. For many years, Jorden also served as Chairman of the Department of East Asian Languages at the U.S. State Department's Foreign Service Institute (FSI).

Jorden also founded several programs, including the intensive FALCON Program at Cornell University and the Foreign Service Institute Japanese Language School in Tokyo, Japan.

== Honors ==
- Order of the Precious Crown, 1985.
- Japan Foundation Award, 1985
- Anthony Papalia Award for Excellence in Teacher Education, American Council on the Teaching of Foreign Languages (ACTFL), 1993.
- Williams College, honorary doctorate.
- Knox College, honorary doctorate.
- Middlebury College, honorary doctorate.
- University of Stirling (Scotland), honorary doctorate.
- President of the Association for Asian Studies in 1980.

== Selected bibliography ==
- Jorden, Eleanor Harz & Chaplin, Hamako Ito (1962) Beginning Japanese: Part 1. New Haven, CT: Yale University Press.
- Jorden, Eleanor Harz & Chaplin, Hamako Ito (1963) Beginning Japanese: Part 2. New Haven, CT: Yale University Press.
- Jorden, Eleanor Harz & Chaplin, Hamako Ito (1976) Reading Japanese. New Haven, CT: Yale University Press.
- Jorden, Eleanor Harz & Noda, Mari (1987). Japanese, The Spoken Language: Part 1. New Haven, CT: Yale University Press.
- Jorden, Eleanor Harz & Noda, Mari (1988). Japanese, The Spoken Language: Part 2. New Haven, CT: Yale University Press.
- Jorden, Eleanor Harz & Noda, Mari (1990). Japanese, The Spoken Language: Part 3. New Haven, CT: Yale University Press.
- Jorden, Eleanor H., with Richard Lambert (1991). Japanese Language Instruction in the United States: Resources, Practice, and Investment Strategy. Washington, D.C.: Natl. Foreign Lang. Center.
