= Nakane Kōtei =

Japanese author

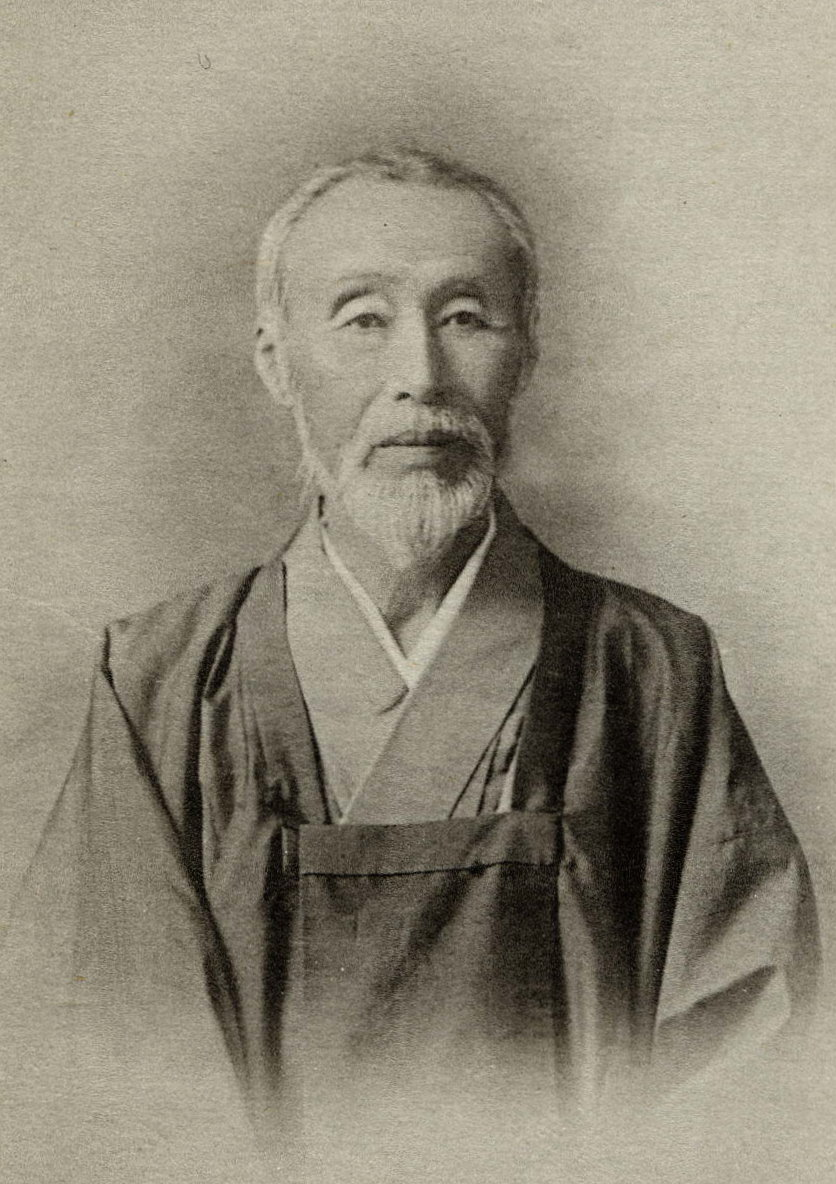
Nakane Kōtei in 1907

Nakane Kōtei (中根 香亭; March 27, 1839 – January 20, 1913) was a Japanese writer who lived during the late Edo period and Meiji era. Writing under the pen name of Kōtei, his given name was Kiyoshi (淑). He was the second son of Sone Nao (曾根 直), and his patrilineal root was the Kai-Genji clan (甲斐源氏).

== Biography ==
Nakane was born in Edo, and was adopted and raised by the Nakane family from childhood. His adoptive parents treated him as a real son and he served them faithfully. Nakane liked Japanese martial arts and read many books, however he had no formal teacher.

=== Military service ===
Nakane served Edo Bakufu as a kachi-metsuke (徒士目), an infantry officer, and became an infantry commandant in the last days of the Edo period. After the Meiji Restoration, Nakane followed Tokugawa Yoshinobu to Suruga (駿河, now Shizuoka prefecture), and worked there at the Numazu Military Academy (沼津兵学校).

In 1873, Nakane was called to the Staff Bureau of Military (陸軍参謀局), and served as a major. In the winter of 1876, he contracted a disease, and became incapable of performing any further physical hard labour. Due to this he resigned his post, and lived in Tokyo for the next five or six years. He was eventually appointed as a sonin-hensankan (奏任編纂官), or "compilation government service" in the Ministry of Education, but resigned several years later. At this point Nakane's life in the public services had ended, and he thereafter followed his literary pursuits.

=== Literature ===
In about 1885, Nakane was offered a position by the publisher Kinkōdō to work as the chief editor and he accepted. While in this position Nakane published many novels written by a younger generation of authors, such as those by Futabatei Shimei and Kōda Rohan.

Nakane was close friends with other writers based in Negishi, a neighbourhood in what is now Taitō, such as Ozawa Keijiro. In 1875, he purchased an abandoned samurai residence and gardened in it extensively.

=== Death ===
After the deaths of his wife and son, Nakane believed that fate was trying to destroy the pedigree of his families, and felt that he should not act against that fate. Nakane never remarried, gave up his house, and roamed from place to place. In his last days, he lived in Okitsu, Shizuoka from 1909 until his death. Nakane died in 1913 at 75 years of age, and his ashes were scattered as requested in his will.

== Notable works ==
Nakane is noted for writing an excellent essay and short biographies. Nakane is not well known today, even in his native Japan, as he wrote using the old Japanese style of prose, or Classical Chinese. While Nakane did not write as a profession, his historical investigations were nonetheless skilfully authored. Possessing wide interests and a deep culture, Nakane's writings covered the history of Japan and China, including their literature. Mori Senzō, an expert on old Japanese literature, remarked that the works of Nakane have the character of a noble samurai.

Nakane's best known works include:

- Kōtei Gadan (香亭雅談), 1886
- Kōtei Zousou (香亭蔵草), 1913
- Kōtei Ibun (香亭遺文), 1916

== See also ==
- Japanese literature
- Biographers
