= Pronouns in Japanese =

Words in Japanese that substitute for a noun or noun phrase

Japanese pronouns (代名詞, daimeishi; Japanese pronunciation: [dä̀í.mé̞ì.ɕì, -mé̞è̞-]) are words in the Japanese language used to address or refer to present people or things, where present means people or things that can be pointed at. The position of things (far away, nearby) and their role in the current interaction (goods, addresser, addressee, bystander) are features of the meaning of those words. The use of pronouns, especially when referring to oneself and speaking in the first person, vary between gender, formality, dialect and region where Japanese is spoken.

According to some Western grammarians, pronouns are not a distinct part of speech in Japanese, but a subclass of nouns, since they behave grammatically just like nouns. (Note: Multiple footnotes:) Among Japanese grammarians, whether pronouns should be considered a distinct part of speech (品詞, hinshi) has varied. Some considered them distinct, (Note: Multiple footnotes: (Note: Of the nine parts of speech (九品, kyūhin), there were nouns (實體言／ヰコトバ, jittaigen/ikotoba) and pronouns (代名言／カヘコトバ, daimeigen/kaekotoba).) (Note: Of the seven parts of speech (七品詞, shichihinshi), there were nouns (名詞／ナコトバ, meishi/nakotoba) and pronouns (代名詞／カハリコトバ, daimeishi/kawarikotoba).) (Note: Of the nine parts of speech (九品詞, kyūhinshi), there were nouns (名詞, meishi) and pronouns (代名詞, daimeishi).)) while others thought they were only nouns. (Note: Multiple footnotes: (Note: Of the eight parts of speech (八品詞, happinshi), there were only nouns (名詞, meishi), while proper nouns (固有名詞, koyūmeishi), pronouns (代名詞, daimeishi) and numerals (數詞, sūshi) were their subclasses.) (Note: Of the five parts of speech (五品詞, gohinshi), there were only nouns (名詞, meishi), while pronouns (代名詞, daimeishi) were their subclass.)) The gakkō bunpō (学校文法; lit. 'school grammar') of today has followed Iwabuchi Etsutarō's model, which does not recognize pronouns as a distinct part of speech, but merely a subclass of nouns (see Japanese grammar § Different classifications).

== Use and etymology ==
In contrast to present people and things, absent people and things can be referred to by naming; for example, by instantiating a class, "the house" (in a context where there is only one house) and presenting things in relation to the present, named and sui generis people or things can be "I'm going home", "I'm going to Hayao's place", "I'm going to the mayor's place", "I'm going to my mother's place" or "I'm going to my mother's friend's place". Functionally, deictic classifiers not only indicate that the referenced person or thing has a spatial position or an interactional role but also classify it to some extent. In addition, Japanese pronouns are restricted by a situation type (register): who is talking to whom about what and through which medium (spoken or written, staged or in private). In that sense, when a male is talking to his male friends, the pronoun set that is available to him is different from those available when a man of the same age talks to his wife and, vice versa, when a woman talks to her husband. These variations in pronoun availability are determined by the register.

In linguistics, generativists and other structuralists suggest that the Japanese language does not have pronouns as such, since, unlike pronouns in most other languages that have them, these words are syntactically and morphologically identical to nouns. As functionalists point out, however, these words function as personal references, demonstratives, and reflexives, just as pronouns do in other languages.

Japanese has a large number of pronouns, differing in use by formality, gender, age, and relative social status of speaker and audience. Further, pronouns are an open class, with existing nouns being used as new pronouns with some frequency. This is ongoing; a recent example is jibun (自分; 'self'), which is now used by some young men as a casual first-person pronoun.

Pronouns are used less frequently in the Japanese language than in many other languages, mainly because there is no grammatical requirement to include the subject in a sentence. That means that pronouns can seldom be translated from English to Japanese on a one-to-one basis.

The common English personal pronouns, such as "I", "you", and "they", have no other meanings or connotations. However, most Japanese personal pronouns do. Consider for example two words corresponding to the English pronoun "I": 私 (watashi) also means "private" or "personal". 僕 (boku) carries a masculine impression; it is typically used by males, especially those in their youth.

Japanese words that refer to other people are part of the encompassing system of honorific speech and should be understood within that context. Pronoun choice depends on the speaker's social status (as compared to the listener's) as well as the sentence's subjects and objects.

The first-person pronouns (e.g., 私 (watashi)) and second-person pronouns (e.g., 貴方 (anata)) are used in formal contexts (however the latter can be considered rude). In many sentences, pronouns that mean "I" and "you" are omitted in Japanese when the meaning is still clear.

When it is required to state the topic of the sentence for clarity, the particle は (wa) is used, but it is not required when the topic can be inferred from context. Also, there are frequently used verbs that imply the subject and/or indirect object of the sentence in certain contexts: kureru (くれる) means "give" in the sense that "somebody other than me gives something to me or to somebody very close to me". Ageru (あげる) also means "give", but in the sense that "someone gives something to someone other than me". This often makes pronouns unnecessary, as they can be inferred from context.

In sentences comprising a single adjective (often those ending in -shii), it is often assumed that the speaker is the subject. For example, the adjective sabishii (寂しい) can represent a complete sentence that means "I am lonely". When speaking of another person's feelings or emotions, sabishisō (寂しそう; 'seems lonely') would be used instead. Similarly, neko ga hoshii (猫が欲しい; 'I want a cat'), as opposed to neko wo hoshigatte iru (猫を欲しがっている; 'seems to want a cat') when referring to others. Thus, the first-person pronoun is usually not used unless the speaker wants to put a special stress on the fact that they are referring to themselves or if it is necessary to make it clear.

In some contexts, it may be considered uncouth to refer to the listener (second person) by a pronoun. If it is required to state the second person, the listener's surname, suffixed with -san or some other title (like "customer", "teacher", or "boss"), is generally used.

Gender differences in spoken Japanese also create another challenge, as men and women refer to themselves with different pronouns. Social standing also determines how people refer to themselves, as well as how they refer to other people.

Most common Japanese first-person pronouns by speakers and situations according to Yuko Saegusa (2009):

First-person pronouns by elementary school pupils (2008)
Speaker	Situation	First	Second	Third
Female	To friends	uchi (うち) 49%	First name 26%	atashi (あたし) 15%
Female	In the family	First name 33%	atashi (あたし) 29%	uchi (うち) 23%
Female	In a class	watashi (わたし) 86%	atashi (あたし) 7%	uchi (うち) 6%
Female	To an unknown visitor	watashi (わたし) 75%	atashi (あたし), first name, uchi (うち) 8% each	
Female	To the class teacher	watashi (わたし) 66%	First name 13%	atashi (あたし) 9%
Male	To friends	ore (おれ) 72%	boku (ぼく) 19%	First name 4%
Male	In the family	ore (おれ) 62%	boku (ぼく) 23%	Others (not including uchi (うち)) 9%
Male	In a class	boku (ぼく) 85%	ore (おれ) 13%	First name, nickname 1% each
Male	To an unknown visitor	boku (ぼく) 64%	ore (おれ) 26%	First name 4%
Male	To the class teacher	boku (ぼく) 67%	ore (おれ) 27%	First name 3%

First-person pronouns by university students (2009)
Speaker	Situation	First	Second	Third
Female	To friends	uchi (うち) 39%	atashi (あたし) 30%	watashi (わたし) 22%
Female	In the family	atashi (あたし) 28%	First name 27%	uchi (うち) 18%
Female	In a class	watashi (わたし) 89%	atashi (あたし) 7%	jibun (じぶん) 3%
Female	To an unknown visitor	watashi (わたし) 81%	atashi (あたし) 10%	jibun (じぶん) 6%
Female	To the class teacher	watashi (わたし) 77%	atashi (あたし) 17%	jibun (じぶん) 7%
Male	To friends	ore (おれ) 87%	uchi (うち) 4%	watashi (わたし), jibun (じぶん) 2% each
Male	In the family	ore (おれ) 88%	boku (ぼく), jibun (じぶん) 5% each	
Male	In a class	watashi (わたし) 48%	jibun (じぶん) 28%	boku (ぼく) 22%
Male	To an unknown visitor	boku (ぼく) 36%	jibun (じぶん) 29%	watashi (わたし) 22%
Male	To the class teacher	jibun (じぶん) 38%	boku (ぼく) 29%	watashi (わたし) 22%

== List of Japanese personal pronouns ==
The list is incomplete, as there are numerous Japanese pronoun forms, which vary by region and dialect. This is a list of the most commonly used forms. "It" has no direct equivalent in Japanese (though in some contexts the demonstrative pronoun sore (それ) is translatable as "it"). Also, Japanese does not generally inflect by case, so, I is equivalent to me.

Romaji and pronunciation	Hiragana	Kanji	Level of speech	Gender	Notes
first-person singular (I/me)
watashi [β̞ä̀.tä́.ɕí]	わたし	私	formal/informal	both	In formal or polite contexts, this is gender neutral; in casual speech, it is typically only used by women. Use by men in casual contexts may be perceived as stiff.
watakushi [β̞ä̀.tä́.kɯ̥.ɕí]	わたくし	私	very formal	both	The most formal personal pronoun. Outdated curriculums did not provide for any other kind of pronoun in everyday speech for foreigners, except for watakushi. However, in modern student books, such a pronoun has been withdrawn from use.
ware [β̞ä́.ɾè̞]	われ	我, 吾	very formal	both	Used in literary style writing. Also used as rude second person in western dialects.
waga [β̞ä́ ɡä̀, -ŋä̀]	わが	我が	very formal	both	Means "my" or "our". Used in speeches and formalities; 我が社 (waga sha) (our company) or 我が国 (waga kuni) (our country).
ore [ò̞.ɾé̞]	おれ	俺	informal	males	Frequently used by men. Establishes a sense of "masculinity". Can be seen as rude depending on the context. Emphasises one's own status when used with peers and with those who are younger or of lesser status. Among close friends or family, its use conveys familiarity rather than "masculinity" or superiority. It was used also by women until the late Edo period and still is in some dialects. Also oi in Kyushu dialect.
boku [bó̞.kɯ̈̀, bò̞.kɯ̈́]	ぼく	僕	formal/informal	males	Used by males of all ages; very often used by boys; can be used by females but then carries tomboyish or feminist connotations. Perceived as humble, but can also carry an undertone of "feeling young" when used by males of older age. Also used when casually giving deference; "servant" uses the same kanji (shimobe (僕)). Can also be used as a second-person pronoun toward male children (English equivalent – "kid" or "squirt").
washi [β̞ä̀.ɕí]	わし	儂	formal/informal	mainly males	Often used in western dialects and fictional settings to stereotypically represent characters of old age. Also wai, a slang version of washi in the Kansai dialect.
jibun [ɟ̟͡ʑì.bɯ̈́ɴ́]	じぶん	自分	neutral	mainly males	Literally "oneself"; used as either reflexive or personal pronoun. Can convey a sense of distance when used in the latter way. Also used as casual second-person pronoun in the Kansai dialect.
ore-sama [ò̞.ɾé̞.sä́.mä́]	おれさま	俺様	informal	mainly (fictional) males	"My esteemed self", "Mr. I". Used in fiction by very self-important or arrogant characters, or humorously.
atai [ä̀.tä́í]	あたい	私	very informal	females	Slang version of あたし (atashi).
atashi [ä̀.tä́.ɕí]	あたし	私	informal	females (but see notes)	A feminine pronoun that strains from わたし (watashi). Rarely used in written language, but common in conversation, especially among younger women. It was formerly used by male members of the merchant and artisan classes in the Edo area and continues to be used by male rakugo performers.
atakushi [ä̀.tä́.kɯ̥̈.ɕí]	あたくし	私	informal	females	A feminine pronoun that strains from わたくし (watakushi).
uchi [ɯ̈̀.c̟͡ɕí]	うち	家, 内	informal	mostly females	Means "one's own". Often used in western dialects especially the Kansai dialect. Generally written in kana. Plural form uchi-ra is used by both genders. Singular form is also used by both sexes when talking about the household, e.g., uchi no neko ('my/our cat'), uchi no chichi-oya ('my father'); also used in less formal business speech to mean "our company", e.g., uchi wa sandai no rekkāsha ga aru ('we (our company) have three tow-trucks')).
(own name)			informal	both	Used by small children and young women; considered cute and childish.
oira [ó̞ì.ɾä̀]	おいら	俺等, 己等	informal	males	Similar to 俺 (ore), but more casual. Evokes a person with a rural background, a "country bumpkin".
ora [ò̞ɾä́]	おら	俺等	informal	both	Dialect in Kanto and further north. Similar to おいら (oira), but more rural. Also ura in some dialects.
wate [β̞ä̀.té̞]	わて		informal	both	Dated Kansai dialect, shifted from watai. Also ate (somewhat feminine).
second-person singular (you)
(name and honorific)			formality depends on the honorific used	both	
anata [ä̀.nä́.tä̀] (Note: The personal pronoun is pronounced only like this. The demonstrative meaning "that way" is either this, or [ä́.nä̀.tä̀].)	あなた	貴方, 貴男, 貴女	formal/informal	both	The kanji are very rarely used. The only second-person pronoun comparable to English "you", yet still not used as often in this universal way by native speakers, as it can be considered having a condescending undertone, especially towards superiors. For expressing "you" in formal contexts, using the person's name with an honorific is more typical. More commonly, anata may be used when having no information about the addressed person; also often used as "you" in commercials, when not referring to a particular person. Furthermore, commonly used by women to address their husband or lover, in a way roughly equivalent to the English "dear".
anta [ä́ǹ.tä̀]	あんた	貴方	informal	both	Contraction of anata (あなた). Can express contempt, anger or familiarity towards a person. Generally seen as rude or uneducated when used in formal contexts.
otaku [ò̞.tä́.kɯ̈́]	おたく	お宅, 御宅	formal, polite	both	A polite way of saying "your house", also used as a pronoun to address a person with slight sense of distance. Otaku/otakki/ota turned into a slang term referring to a type of geek/obsessive hobbyist, as they often addressed each other as otaku.
omae [ò̞.mä́.é̞], (Note: The personal pronoun is pronounced only like this. The form of address meaning "Your Augustness/Highness" is [ò̞.mä́.è̞].) omē [ò̞.mé̞é̞]	おまえ, おめえ	お前	very informal	both	Similar to anta, but used by men with more frequency. Expresses the speaker's higher status or age, or a very casual relationship among peers. Often used with ore (おれ). Very rude if said to elders. Commonly used by men to address their wife or lover, paralleling the female use of anata.
temē [tè̞.mé̞é̞], temae [tè̞.mä́.é̞]	てめえ, てまえ	手前	rude and confrontational	mainly males	Literal meaning "the one in front of my hand". Temē, a reduction of temae, is more rude. Used when the speaker is very angry. Originally used for a humble first person. The Kanji are seldom used with this meaning, as unrelated to its use as a pronoun, 手前 can also mean "before", "this side", "one's standpoint" or "one's appearance".
kisama [k̟ʲi̥.sä́.mä́]	きさま	貴様	extremely hostile and rude	mainly males	Historically very formal, but has developed in an ironic sense to show the speaker's extreme hostility / outrage towards the addressee.
kimi [k̟ʲì.mʲí]	きみ	君	informal	both	The kanji means "lord" (archaic) and is also used to write -kun. Informal to subordinates; can also be affectionate; formerly very polite. Among peers typically used with boku (僕). Often seen as rude or assuming when used with superiors, elders or strangers.
kika [k̟ʲi̥.kä̀, -kä́]	きか	貴下	informal, to a younger person	both	
kikan ja	きかん	貴官	very formal, used to address government officials, military personnel, etc.	both	
onsha [ó̞ɰ̃̀.ɕä̀]	おんしゃ	御社	formal, used to the listener representing your company	both	Only used in spoken language.
kisha [k̟ʲi̥.ɕä̀, -ɕä́]	きしゃ	貴社	formal, similar to onsha	both	Only used in written language as opposed to onsha.
third-person singular (he / she)
ano kata [ä̀.nó̞ kä́.tä́, -tä̀]	あのかた	あの方	very formal	both	Sometimes pronounced ano hou, but with the same kanji. 方 means "direction", and is more formal by avoiding referring to the actual person in question.
ano hito [ä̀.nó̞ çi̥.tó̞]	あのひと	あの人	neutral	both	Literally "that person".
yatsu [jä́.t͡sɨ̀]	やつ	奴	informal	both	A thing (very informal), dude, guy.
koitsu [kò̞í.t͡sɨ́], koyatsu [kò̞.jä́.t͡sɨ́, kó̞.jä̀.t͡sɨ̀]	こいつ, こやつ	此奴	very informal, implies contempt	both	Denotes a person or material nearby the speaker. Analogous to "he/she" or "this one".
soitsu [sò̞í.t͡sɨ́], soyatsu [sò̞.jä́.t͡sɨ́, só̞.jä̀.t͡sɨ̀]	そいつ, そやつ	其奴	very informal, implies contempt	both	Denotes a person or material nearby the listener. Analogous to "he/she" or "that one".
aitsu [ä̀í.t͡sɨ́], ayatsu [ä̀.jä́.t͡sɨ́, ä́.jä̀.t͡sɨ̀]	あいつ, あやつ	彼奴	very informal, implies contempt	both	Denotes a person or (less frequently) material far from both the speaker and the listener. Analogous to "he/she" or "that one".
third-person singular masculine (he)
kare [kä́.ɾè̞]	かれ	彼	formal (neutral) and informal (boyfriend)	both	Can also mean "boyfriend". Formerly kareshi (彼氏) was its equivalent, but this now often means "boyfriend". Literally meaning "that one", in classical Japanese it could mean "he", "she", or "it".
third-person singular feminine (she)
kanojo [kä́.nò̞.(ɟ̟͡)ʑò̞]	かのじょ	彼女	formal (neutral) and informal (girlfriend)	both	Originally created in the 19th century as an equivalent to female pronouns in European languages. Initially pronounced kano onna, it literally means "that female". Can also mean "girlfriend".
first-person plural (we) (see also list of pluralising suffixes, below)
ware-ware [β̞ä̀.ɾé̞.β̞ä́.ɾé̞]	われわれ	我々	formal	both	Mostly used when speaking on behalf of a company or group.
ware-ra [β̞ä́.ɾè̞.ɾä̀]	われら	我等	informal	both	Used in literary style. ware is never used with -tachi.
heisha [hé̞ì.ɕä̀, hé̞è̞-]	へいしゃ	弊社	formal and humble	both	Used when representing one's own company. From a Sino-Japanese word meaning "low company" or "humble company".
waga sha	わがしゃ	我が社	formal	both	Used when representing one's own company.
third-person plural (they) (see also list of pluralising suffixes, below)
kare-ra [kä́.ɾè̞.ɾä̀]	かれら	彼等	common in spoken Japanese and writing	both	

=== Job-related personal pronouns ===
Romaji and pronunciation	Hiragana	Kanji	Level of speech	Gender	Notes
first-person singular (I/me)
shōsei [ɕó̞ò̞.sè̞ì, -sè̞è̞]	しょうせい	小生	formal, written	males	Used among academic colleagues. Lit. "your pupil".
shōkan [ɕó̞ò̞.kä̀ɴ̀] (Note: The personal pronoun is pronounced only like this. The common noun meaning "small-time official" is [ɕò̞ó̞.kä́ɴ́, ɕó̞ó̞-].)	しょうかん	小官	informal	both	Slightly old-fashioned pronoun that is used by military and government officials in a humble manner. Lit. "petty official".
honkan [hó̞ŋ̀.kä̀ɴ̀] (Note: The personal pronoun is pronounced only like this. The common noun meaning "officially appointed official" is [hò̞ŋ́.kä́ɴ́, hó̞ŋ́-].)	ほんかん	本官	formal	both	Used by government officials or people working in the civil service. Rarely used nowadays, however it is sometimes used in fiction by police officers.
honshoku [hó̞ɰ̃̀.ɕò̞.kɯ̈̀] (Note: The personal pronoun is pronounced only like this. The common noun meaning "primary job title" is [hò̞ɰ̃́.ɕó̞.kɯ̈́, hó̞ɰ̃́-].)	ほんしょく	本職	formal	both	Used by public officials in their work. In statement records, this pronoun is used to indicate that the person taking the statement is a prosecutor or police officer depending on context.
shōshoku [ɕó̞ò̞.ɕò̞.kɯ̈̀] (Note: The personal pronoun is pronounced only like this. The common noun meaning "small-time official" is [ɕò̞ó̞.ɕó̞.kɯ̈́, ɕó̞ó̞-].)	しょうしょく	小職	informal	both	Traditionally used in public sector, usually by lower ranking occupants, however it isn't necessarily a hierarchical equivalent of "honshoku". It is incorrect to be used by someone who works at a private company, however lately it became more common.
henshū-shi	へんしゅうし	編集子	formal	both	Used in newspapers and articles by the editor when referring to themselves. 子 is often read as "ko", however in this context it is pronounced as "shi".
hissha [çíɕ.ɕä̀, çìɕ.ɕä́]	ひっしゃ	筆者	formal	both	First person pronoun used by authors to refer to themselves in novels and other literature. Lit. "author".
sakusha [sä́.kɯ̥̈.ɕä̀, sä̀.kɯ̥̈.ɕä́]	さくしゃ	作者	formal	both	Another first person pronoun used by authors when referring to themselves.
sensei [sè̞ɰ̃́.sé̞ì, -sé̞è̞, sé̞ɰ̃́-]	せんせい	先生	formal	both	Used by elementary, middle, and high school teachers when speaking to students. It sometimes includes the family name. Doctors in the medical industry also use this pronoun when speaking to very young patients.
gusō [ɡɯ̈́.sò̞ò̞, ɡɯ̈̀.só̞ó̞]	ぐそう	愚僧	informal	both	A humble pronoun used by monks, using third person to refer to oneself. Lit. "this foolish monk". This pronoun is well-known due to having been used by Shinran.
gutoku [ɡɯ̈́.tò̞kɯ̈̀, ɡɯ̈̀.tó̞kɯ̈́]	ぐとく	愚禿	informal	both	A variant of gusō.
sessō [sé̞s.sò̞ò̞, sè̞s.só̞ó̞]	せっそう	拙僧	informal	both	Another humble pronoun being used by monks. Also uses third person to refer to oneself. Lit. "this unworthy monk".
tōkyoku [tó̞ò̞.k̟ʲj̊ò̞.kɯ̈̀]	とうきょく	当局	formal	both	It is used between amateur radio operators. This pronoun is used in such due to the fact that the sender is the transmitting station.
second-person singular (you)
kikyoku	ききょく	貴局	formal	both	Used between amateur radio operators when referring to the other operator.

=== Archaic personal pronouns ===
Romaji and pronunciation	Hiragana	Kanji	Meaning	Level of speech	Gender	Notes
asshi [ä̀ɕ.ɕí]	あっし	私	I		males	Slang version of watashi. From the Edo period.
sessha [sè̞ɕ.ɕä́]	せっしゃ	拙者	I		males	Used by samurai during the feudal ages (and often also by ninja in fictionalised portrayals). From a Sino-Japanese word meaning "one who is clumsy".
wagahai [β̞ä̀ ɡä́ hä́í, -ŋä́-]	わがはい	我(が)輩, 吾(が)輩	I		males	Literally "my fellows; my class; my cohort", but used in a somewhat pompous manner as a first-person singular pronoun.
soregashi [sò̞.ɾé̞.ɡä̀.ɕì, -ŋä̀.ɕì, -ɡä́.ɕì, -ŋä́.ɕì]	それがし	某	I		males	Literally "So-and-so", a nameless expression. Similar to sessha.
warawa [β̞ä́.ɾä̀.β̞ä̀]	わらわ	妾	I		females	Literally "child". Mainly used by women in samurai families. Today, it is used in fictional settings to represent archaic noble female characters.
wachiki	わちき		I		females	Used by geisha and oiran in Edo period. Also achiki (あちき) and wacchi (わっち).
yo [jó̞]	よ	余, 予	I		males	Archaic first-person singular pronoun.
chin [c̟͡ɕíɴ̀]	ちん	朕	We		both	Used only by the Emperor, mostly before World War II.
maro	まろ	麻呂, 麿	I		males	Used as a universal first-person pronoun in ancient times. Today, it is used in fictional settings to represent Court noble male characters.
onore [ò̞.nó̞.ɾé̞]	おのれ	己	I or you		males	The word onore, as well as the kanji used to transcribe it, literally means "oneself". It is humble when used as a first-person pronoun and hostile (on the level of てめえ (temee) or てまえ (temae)) when used as a second-person pronoun.
kei [ké̞ì, ké̞è̞]	けい	卿	you		males	Second-person pronoun, used mostly by males. Used among peers to denote light respect, and by a superior addressing his subjects and retainers in a familiar manner. Like 君 (kimi), this can also be used as an honorific (pronounced as きょう (kyou)), in which case it's equivalent to "lord/lady" or "sir/dame".
nanji [nä́ɲ̟̀.ɟ̟͡ʑì, nä̀ɲ̟́.ɟ̟͡ʑí, nä́ɲ̟́.ɟ̟͡ʑí]	なんじ	汝, less commonly also 爾	you, often translated as "thou"		both	Spelled as なむち (namuchi) in the most ancient texts and later as なんち (nanchi) or なんぢ (nanji).
onushi [ò̞.nɨ́.ɕì]	おぬし	御主, お主	you		both	Used by elders and samurai to talk to people of equal or lower rank. Literally means "master".
sonata [só̞.nä̀.tä̀, sò̞.nä́-]	そなた	其方 (rarely used)	you		both	Originally a mesial deictic pronoun meaning "that side; that way; that direction"; used as a lightly respectful second-person pronoun in previous eras, but now used when speaking to an inferior in a pompous and old-fashioned tone.
sochi [só̞.c̟͡ɕì]	そち	其方 (rarely used)	you		both	Similar to そなた (sonata). Literally means "that way". (Sochira and kochira, sometimes shortened to sotchi and kotchi, are still sometimes used to mean roughly "you" and "I, we", e.g. kochira koso in response to thanks or an apology means literally "this side is the one" but idiomatically "no, I (or we) thank/apologise to you"; especially common on the telephone, analogous to phrases like "on this end" and "on your end" in English. Kochira koso is often translated as "me/us, too" or "likewise" – it is certainly a reciprocation gesture, but sometimes a little more.)

== Suffixes ==
Suffixes are added to pronouns to make them plural.

Romaji	Hiragana	Kanji	Level of speech	Notes
tachi	たち	達	informal; examples: 僕達 (boku-tachi; [bó̞.kɯ̥̈.tä̀.c̟͡ɕì]); 私達 (watashi-tachi; [β̞ä̀.tä́.ɕi̥.tä̀.c̟͡ɕì]); あなた達 (anata-tachi); 君達 (kimi-tachi; [k̟ʲì.mʲí.tä̀.c̟͡ɕì, -tä́-])	Also can be attached to names to indicate that person and the group they are with (Ryuichi-tachi = "Ryuichi and friends").
kata, gata	かた, がた	方	formal (e.g. あなた方 (anata-gata; [ä̀.nä́.tä́.ɡä́.tä̀, -ŋä́.tä̀, -tä́]))	More polite than 達 (tachi). gata is the rendaku form.
domo	ども	共	humble (e.g. 私ども (watakushi-domo; [β̞ä̀.tä́.kɯ̥̈.ɕí.dó̞.mò̞]))	Casts some aspersion on the mentioned group, so it can be rude. domo is the rendaku form.
ra	ら	等	informal (e.g. 彼ら (kare-ra). 俺ら (ore-ra; [ò̞.ɾé̞.ɾä̀]). 奴ら (yatsu-ra; [jä́.t͡sɨ̀.ɾä̀]). あいつら (aitsu-ra))	Used with informal pronouns. Frequently used with hostile words. Sometimes used for light humble as domo (e.g. 私ら (watashi-ra)).

== Demonstrative and interrogative pronouns ==
Demonstrative words, whether functioning as pronouns, adjectives or adverbs, fall into four groups. Words beginning with ko- indicate something close to the speaker (so-called proximal demonstratives). Those beginning with so- indicate separation from the speaker or closeness to the listener (medial), while those beginning with a- indicate greater distance (distal). Interrogative words, used in questions, begin with do-.

Demonstratives are normally written in hiragana.

Romaji and pronunciation	Hiragana	Kanji	Meaning
kore [kò̞.ɾé̞]	これ	此れ	this thing / these things (close to the 1st person)
sore [sò̞.ɾé̞]	それ	其れ	that thing / those things (close to the 2nd person)
are [ä̀.ɾé̞]	あれ	彼れ	that thing / those things (far from both the 1st and 2nd persons)
dore [dó̞.ɾè̞]	どれ	何れ	which thing(s)?
kochira [kò̞.c̟͡ɕí.ɾä́], kotchi [kò̞c̟̚.c̟͡ɕí]	こちら, こっち	此方	this / here (close to the 1st person)
sochira [sò̞.c̟͡ɕí.ɾä́], sotchi [sò̞c̟̚.c̟͡ɕí]	そちら, そっち	其方	that / there (close to the 2nd person)
achira [ä̀.c̟͡ɕí.ɾä́], atchi [ä̀c̟̚.c̟͡ɕí]	あちら, あっち	彼方	that / there (far from both the 1st and 2nd persons)
dochira [dó̞.c̟͡ɕì.ɾä̀], dotchi [dó̞c̟̚.c̟͡ɕì]	どちら, どっち	何方	what / where

When a Japanese speaker uses ko-, so- and a- forms, they are not necessarily considering spatial distance, but also psychological, temporal and topical distance.

For more forms, see Japanese demonstratives on Wiktionary.

Other interrogative pronouns include 何 なに (nani; [nä́.ɲ̟ì] 'what?') and 誰 だれ (dare; [dä́.ɾè̞] 'who(m)?').

== Reflexive ==
Japanese has only one word corresponding to reflexive pronouns such as myself, yourself, or themselves in English. The word 自分 (jibun) means "one's self" and may be used for some animals, including humans. It is not used for cold-blooded animals or inanimate objects.

== Old Japanese pronouns ==
Each Old Japanese pronoun has a "long" form that ends in -re, and a "short" form without -re. When combining with a genitive particle, the short forms of personal pronouns, as well as animate nouns, notably combined only with ga, while demonstratives (ko, so, (k)a) and inanimate nouns combined with no, only with ga in limited circumstances; in contrast, modern Japanese pronouns (many of which were originally nouns) and nouns only combine with no. The short forms are used with ga and in compounds, while the long forms are used independently.

Old Japanese personal pronouns
Person	Long form	Short form	Genitive form
1st	(w)are "I/me"	(w)a	(w)a-ga "my/mine"
2nd	nare "thou/thee"	na	na-ga "thy/thine"
3rd		si	si-ga "his/her(s)"
	tare "who(m)"	ta	ta-ga "whose"

Of these, tare evolved into modern dare, whose genitive form is simply dare-no. Ta-ga is sometimes used for literary effect, for example in the Japanese title of For Whom the Bell Tolls (誰がために鐘は鳴る, Ta-ga Tame-ni Kane-wa Naru). Ware is often used in fiction, and wa-ga in fixed expressions, such as 我が国 (wa-ga kuni; 'my/our country').

Genitive forms, when combining with a noun that began in a vowel, may fuse with it. For example, wa-ga "my" + imo "sister" → wa-gimo "my sister"; wa-ga + ipe_{1} "house" → wa-gipe_{1} "my house" (wa-gie in modern Japanese).

Old Japanese demonstratives
Type	Long form	Short form	Genitive form
Proximal (close to the 1st person)	kore	ko	ko-no
Mesial (close to the 2nd person)	sore	so	so-no
Distal (far from both the 1st and 2nd persons)	kare	ka	ka-no

These demonstratives largely survived intact into modern Japanese. Kare came to be used as a gender-neutral third-person personal pronoun, and eventually used to translate masculine third-person pronouns specifically in European languages ("he/him"), while ka-no was used to create kanojo and to translate feminine pronouns ("she/her").

== The modern pronouns kanojo and kareshi ==
The third-person feminine pronoun, kanojo (彼(かの)女(じょ)), had not existed until sometime around the end of the Tokugawa shogunate and the beginning of the Meiji era. Prior to this, the distal demonstrative pronoun kare, are (彼; lit. 'that' (locationally, someone or something far from both the 1st and 2nd persons)) was used as a gender-neutral personal pronoun.

彼女 started out as a mere shortened spelling of the phrase ka-no onna (かのをんな), which could be spelt in full as 彼(か)の女(をんな), literally simply means "that female person", and is composed of the genitive form of kare, ka-no, and the noun onna. Although not being a pronoun in a lexicographic sense, this phrase can be used pronominally like modern expressions such as a-no hito (あの人; lit. 'that person') or a-no mono (あの者; lit. 'that individual') for the singular "they/them", a-no otoko (あの男; lit. 'that male person') for "he/him", and of course, a-no onna (あの女; lit. 'that female person') for "she/her". The pronunciation of this phrase was consistently listed as ka-no onna (カノヲンナ) across various pronunciation dictionaries for elementary students during the Meiji era. (Note: Multiple footnotes: (Note: Also a-no onna (アノヲンナ).) (Note: Spelt ka-no onna (カノオンナ). Also hijo (ヒジヨ).) (Note: Also a-no musume (アノムスメ; lit. 'that daughter/girl').)) The earliest exception was the 1876 dictionary Kaisei Shōgaku Tokuhon Jibiki (改正小學讀本字引) by 田中𦤺知, which listed KA-NO JO Mukō-ni iru musume (彼(カノ)女(ジヨ) ムカウニヰルムスメ; lit. 'THAT FEMALE-PERSON: The girl who is way over there'). (Note: Mukau-ni wiru musume (ムカウニヰルムスメ) would be spelt in modern Japanese as mukō-ni iru musume (向こうにいる娘). This gloss is very literal in that it conveys the demonstrative meaning of kare and ka-no as referring to persons or things physically far away from both the 1st and 2nd persons, rather than the abstract pronomimal usage of such expression as "that female person.") It has been suggested that the editor may have simply used ka-no jo for novelty back when jo (女) was still commonly used as a free noun. This unique pronunciation was listed in a few later dictionaries. (Note: Multiple footnotes:) The same aforementioned dictionaries and more also listed ka-no otoko (彼(カノ)男(ヲトコ); lit. 'that male person'), (Note: Multiple footnotes: (Note: Spelt ka-no otoko (カノオトコ).) (Note: Also a-no otoko (アノヲトコ).) (Note: Spelt ka-no otoko (カノオトコ). Also hinan (ヒナン).))ka-no mono (彼(カノ)者(モノ); lit. 'that individual') (Note: Multiple footnotes: (Note: Also a-no mono (アノモノ).)) and ka-no hito (彼(カノ)人(ヒト); lit. 'that person'). (Note: Multiple footnotes:)

The phrase ka-no onna (and its alternative ka-no jo) rose to prominence due to Meiji writers' need to translate third-person feminine pronouns in European languages, such as she and her in English or elle and elles in French, which they eventually incorporated into their own writings. An 1871 French-Japanese dictionary translated elle as ka-no onna-wa. ka-no onna-ni. tsuma (彼女ハ。彼女ニ。夫; lit. 'that-gen female-person-top; that-gen female-person-dat; spouse'), and elles as kare-ra (彼等; lit. 'those'); an 1885 English-Japanese dictionary translated her as ka-no onna. ka-no onna-ni. ka-no onna-o (彼(カ)ノ女(ヲンナ)。彼ノ女ニ。彼ノ女ヲ; lit. 'that-gen female-person; that-gen female-person-dat; that-gen female-person-acc'), herself as ka-no onna jishin-ni (彼女自身(カノヲンナジシン)ニ; lit. 'that-gen female-person self-ins'), and she as ka-no onna. mesu (彼女。雌(カノヲンナメス); lit. 'that-gen female-person; female'). In contrast, masculine pronouns such as he (Note: kare-ga. kare-wa. karehito-ga (彼(カレ)ガ。彼ハ。彼人(カレヒト)ガ。; lit. 'that-nom; that-top; that-person-nom'))/him (Note: kare-o. kare-ni (彼(カレ)ヲ。彼(カレ)ニ; lit. 'that-acc; that-dat'))/his, (Note: kare-no. karehito-no (彼(カレ)ノ。彼人(カレヒト)ノ; lit. 'that-gen; that-person-gen')) il (Note: kare. sore (彼。其; lit. 'that (far from both the 1st and 2nd persons); that (close to the 2nd person)'))/ils, (Note: kare-ra (彼等)) etc. were translated with kare (彼) and kare-ra (彼等).

Kanojo, as a lexicalized pronoun, was first attested in literature in its written furigana-glossed form as kanojo (彼(かの)女(じよ)) in the 1885 novel Tōsei Shosei Katagi (當世書生気質) by Tsubouchi Shōyō. Meanwhile, Sudō Nansui (Mitsuaki) used shī (彼女(シー); lit. 'she') and ka-no onna (彼(かの)女(をんな)) in his 1887 novel The Ladies of New Style (新粧之佳人, Shinsō no Kajin); and Futabatei Shimei used are (彼女(あれ); lit. 'that') in his novel Ukigumo published in the same year. As a phrase, ka-no onna/ka-no jo referred to female non-relatives, but as a pronoun, kanojo came to be used for female family members in literature, for example by Natsume Sōseki in his 1912 novel To the Spring Equinox and Beyond (彼岸過迄, Higan Sugi-made), where a character refers to his mother as kanojo (彼(かの)女(ぢよ)); the regular phrase ka-no onna (彼(かの)女(をんな)) still occurs in reference to a different woman. At this point, the phrase ka-no onna and the pronoun kanojo coexisted with different usages even in the same work. Kanojo eventually acquired its status as a lexicalized noun meaning "girlfriend" during the late Taishō era.

The third-person masculine pronoun kareshi (彼氏; [kä́.ɾè̞.ɕì]) was coined during the early Shōwa era as an alternative to the once-gender-neutral kare (彼) and as the opposite to the feminine kanojo (彼女). Its first written attestation as a pronoun is attributed to Tokugawa Musei's 1929 essay collection Mandanshū (漫談集); as a noun meaning "boyfriend", to Nagai Kafū's 1934 novel Hikage-no Hana (ひかげの花). Morphologically, kareshi (彼氏) is composed of the aforementioned demonstrative-turned-personal pronoun kare (彼) and -shi (氏), the latter of which is an honorific suffix to names, mostly male names, and can be translated as "Mr." Kareshi was often used in a tongue-in-cheek way; compare the masculine and self-aggrandizing ore-sama (俺様), which also consists of a pronoun (ore (俺; "I/me")) and an honorific suffix (-sama (様)).

== See also ==
- Gender differences in spoken Japanese
- Japanese honorifics
