= List of protected heritage sites in Leuze-en-Hainaut =

This table shows an overview of the protected heritage sites in the Walloon town Leuze-en-Hainaut. This list is part of Belgium's national heritage.

Object	Year/architect	Town/section	Address	Coordinates	Number^{?}	Image
Tower of the church of Saint-Pierre ^{(nl)} ^{(fr)}		Leuze-en-Hainaut		50.600663°N 3.622366°E	57094-CLT-0001-01 Info	Toren van de kerk Saint-Pierre
Castle "La Catoire" ^{(nl)} ^{(fr)}		Leuze-en-Hainaut	rue de la Catoire, n° 11	50.601338°N 3.681459°E	57094-CLT-0003-01 Info	
Watermill "La Catoire," also called "Moulin d'Anfroidpont" ^{(nl)} ^{(fr)}		Leuze-en-Hainaut		50.598401°N 3.683536°E	57094-CLT-0004-01 Info	
Church of Saint-Michel, except the tower ^{(nl)} ^{(fr)}		Leuze-en-Hainaut	Grandmetz	50.622668°N 3.632155°E	57094-CLT-0006-01 Info	
Pillory located in the courtyard of the rectory ^{(nl)} ^{(fr)}		Leuze-en-Hainaut		50.622884°N 3.632063°E	57094-CLT-0007-01 Info	
Common park "Le Coron" ^{(nl)} ^{(fr)}		Leuze-en-Hainaut		50.594465°N 3.617531°E	57094-CLT-0008-01 Info	

== See also ==
- List of protected heritage sites in Hainaut (province)
- Leuze-en-Hainaut
