= OIRA =

OIRA is an acronym that may stand for:

- Online interactive Risk Assessment
- Office of Information and Regulatory Affairs in the United States Office of Management and Budget
- Official Irish Republican Army
- Oira, a Japanese pronoun
