= Brasserie à vapeur =

Belgian brewery

Brasserie à vapeur is a Belgian brewery based in Pipaix. The original brewery was opened in 1785. The brewery was reopened in 1984 by a Jean-Louis Dits and his wife, Sittelle. They brew the following beers :

- Saison de Pipaix -A French-Belgian style saison
- Vapeur en folie
- Vapeur cochonne -The brewery's flagship beer
- Vapeur vanille -An herb and spice beer

== History ==
Brasserie Vapeur means "Steam Brewery". "Vapeur" is "Steam" in French. An old steam engine drives a single belt, like an automotive universal belt, that runs all of the brewery's equipment.

The original brewery was opened in 1785. At some point in the late 18th or early 19th century, Cornil Cuvelier inherited the brewery, but he died at a young age and his son, Joseph Dominica I succeeded his father in running the brewery. In 1890, the brewery was estimated at 45000 FB, (approximately €175,000). The brewery's clientele was mostly neighbouring villages.

In 1903, the brewery was taken over by Joseph Ferdinant's widow. In 1914, the occupying German military was requisitioning all metal resources for the war effort and attempted to take the steam engine from the brewery, but were only able to take a copper vat. In 1926, the brewery was able to resume production, after it had been rebuilt and new equipment had been purchased.

In 1930, Gaston Biset, who had married Joseph Ferdinant's daughter, sought to recreate the tradition of Cuvelier. He created new beers like Cuver-Ale and Biss. The Second World War did not create serious problems for the brewery, and after the conflict, the brewery had attained a distinct reputation. Gaston Biset ran the brewery until 1983.

In 1984, Jean-Louis Dits and his wife, Vinciane, purchased the brewery. Monsieur Dits is still the current owner.

Since 1992, Belgian cartoonist Louis-Michel Carpentier has designed the bottle labels. Tours of the brewery are available on the last Saturday of each month.
