= Leuze-en-Hainaut =

City in Hainaut Province, Wallonia, Belgium

Leuze-en-Hainaut: Leuze-in-Hénau (Picard)
- Municipality
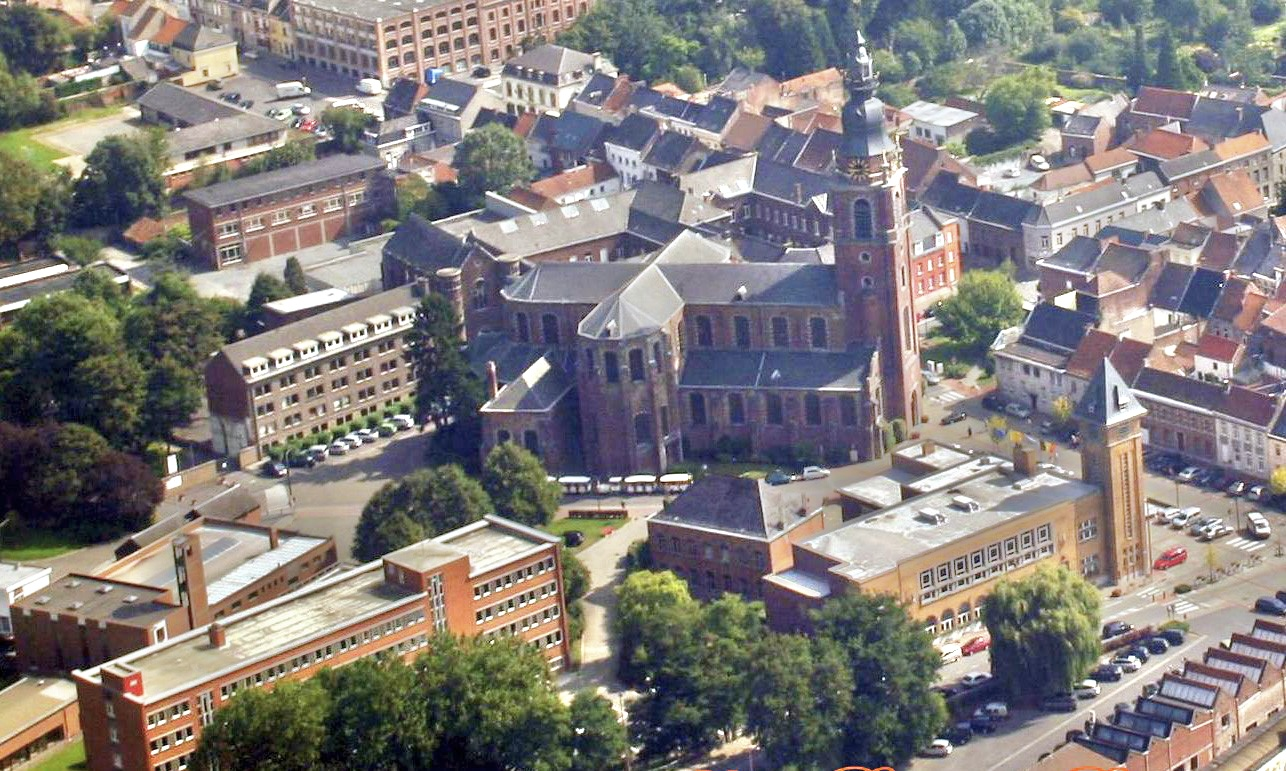

- Flag Coat of arms

- The municipality in the province of Hainaut
- Interactive map of Leuze-en-Hainaut
- Location in Belgium
- Coordinates: 50°35′58″N 3°37′12″E
- Country: Belgium
- Community: French Community
- Region: Wallonia
- Province: Hainaut
- Arrondissement: Tournai-Mouscron

Government
  - Mayor: Lucien Rawart (MR)
  - Governing parties: MR, IDEES

Area
  - Total: 74.46 km^{2} (28.75 sq mi)

Population (2026-01-01)
  - Total: 14,217
  - Density: 190.9/km^{2} (494.5/sq mi)
- Postal codes: 7900-7906
- NIS code: 57094
- Area codes: 069
- Website: www.leuze-en-hainaut.be

Leuze-en-Hainaut (French pronunciation: [løz ɑ̃ ɛno]; Picard: Leuze-in-Hénau; Walloon: Leuze-e-Hinnot) is a city and municipality of Wallonia located in the province of Hainaut, Belgium.

On 1 January 2018, it had a population of 13,886.

The municipality consists of the following districts: Blicquy, Chapelle-à-Oie, Chapelle-à-Wattines, Gallaix, Grandmetz, Leuze-en-Hainaut, Pipaix, Thieulain, Tourpes, and Willaupuis.

== Famous landmarks ==
- The Collegiate Church of Saint Peter was erected in 1745 on the site of a former Gothic church, destroyed by fire. The building's sumptuous interior features intricate woodwork, including the carved Louis XVth style panels of the confessionals, decorated with a variety of motifs, a sculpted representation of Saint Peter in chains, below the pulpit, and the organ casing.

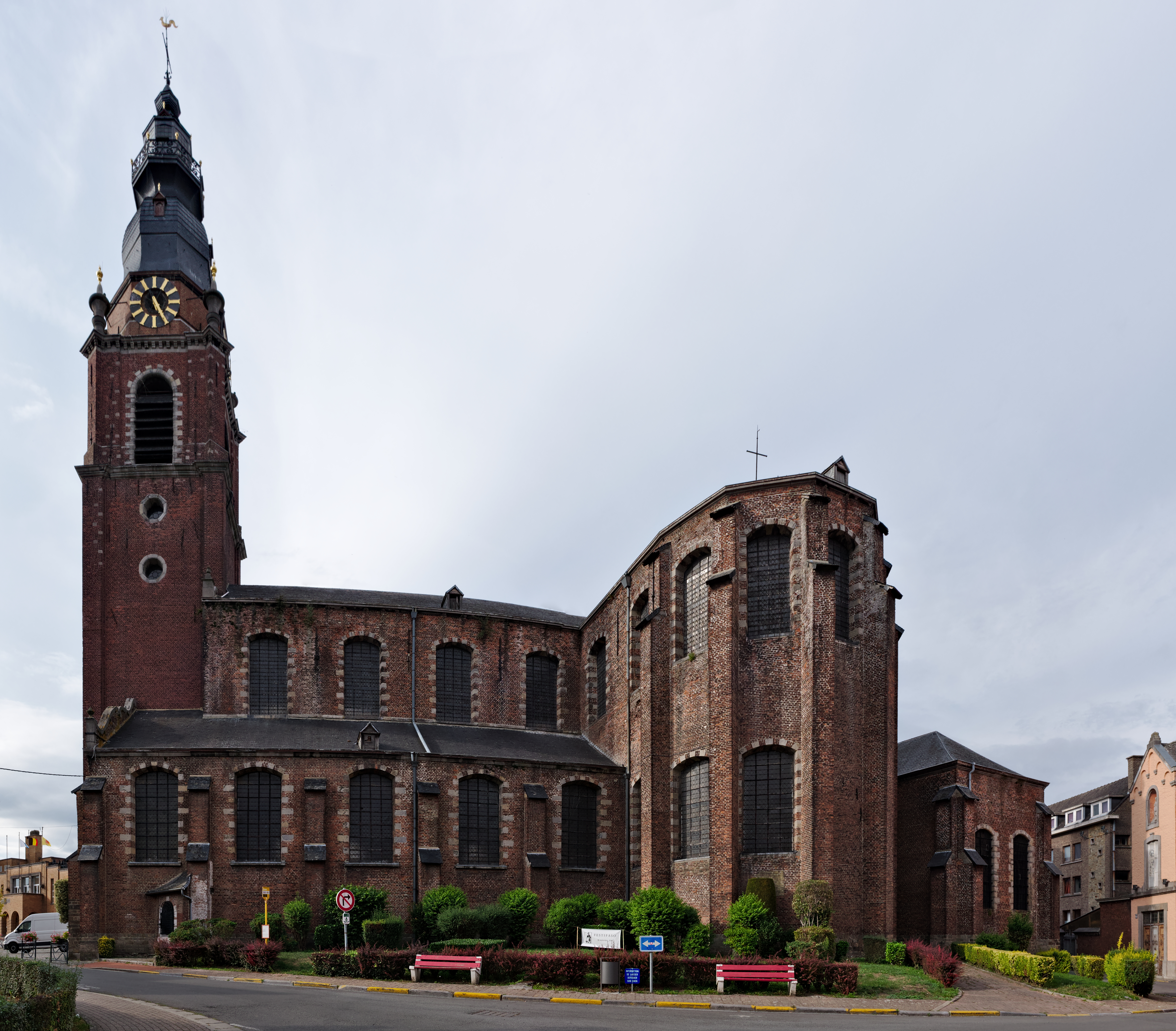
Collegiate Church of St Peter

== Twin towns ==
- - Loudun (France) (1961)
- - Ouagadougou (Burkina Faso) (1968)
- - Carencro, Louisiana (United States) (1993)

== Notable people ==
- Germaine Marie-Thérèse Hannevart, teacher and peace campaigner

== See also ==
- Brasserie à vapeur
