= Ukigumo (novel) =

1887 Novel by Shimei Futabatei

- Author: Shimei Futabatei
- Translator: Marleigh Grayer Ryan
- Language: Japanese
- Genre: Realism
- Publisher: Kinkodo
- Publication date: 1887–1889
- Publication place: Japan
- English publication date: 1967
- Media type: Print

Ukigumo (Japanese: 浮雲; lit. 'Drifting Cloud') is an 1887 Japanese novel by Shimei Futabatei. Published in three parts (with the last one in serialised form) between June 1887 and August 1889, it is frequently referred to as the first modern Japanese novel.

== Plot ==
Part One

The reader is introduced to friends and colleagues Bunzō and Noboru, who both work as low-ranking government officials in Tokyo. Bunzō has just lost his job for no apparent reason, startled because he considers himself to be more educated than the majority of the staff, while another colleague was fired for talking back to the supervisor. He returns to his home at his uncle Magobei's house, where he has been raised since the death of his father. The only other persons in the house are his aunt Omasa, Magobei's and Omasa's daughter Osei, and maid Onabe (Magobei is seldom at home due to his job, while their son is attending a boarding school). Osei, who is described as a volatile and superficial character, has just reached the age to get married. Bunzō has been in love with Osei for a long time, but although she treats him kindly and her parents have hinted at their endorsement of a possible marriage, Bunzō has not found the courage to tell Osei of his feelings. He receives a letter from his mother who lives in the countryside, in which she expresses her hope that, once he has married and settled down, he will take her in with him. When Bunzō finally finds the right moment to tell Omasa of his dismissal, she blames his pride and nonconformity as the reasons for this and points to the career-orientated Noboru as a positive example. She reminds him of his responsibility for his old mother, while the subject of a possible marriage with Osei is not touched upon anymore by her. A bit later, Noboru pays a visit to give the news of his promotion. Omasa suggests to visit the chrysanthemum displays at Dangozaka (Note: A hill located in what is nowadays Tokyo's Bunkyō ward.) together the day after tomorrow and, after Noboru has left, tries to awaken Osei's interest in the successful young man.

Part Two

Omasa, Osei and Noboru make an excursion to Dangozaka together. At Dangozaka, Noboru runs into his supervisor, who is accompanied by his wife and his young sister-in-law, and smooth-talks him. Meanwhile, Bunzō, who stayed at home at his own will, is disappointed by the fact that Osei seemed not to care about his not joining them. A few days later, Noboru visits again. With Omasa and Osei present, Noboru tells Bunzō that rumours of rehirings at the office have been spreading, and offers to put in a good word for him. Bunzō feels insulted to the extent that he has to keep himself from hitting Noboru. He eventually breaks ties with his former friend, for which he is scolded by Omasa who considers Noboru a regular guest of the house, urging him to reconsider Noboru's offer. Bunzō approaches Osei, convinced that she still feels for him and will take his side. Instead, he has to learn that not only Osei refuses–at her mother's instructions–to share his viewpoint, but has also grown fond of Noboru. Furiously, he vows never to speak to her again. When Omasa hears of this, she declares that all plans of a possible marriage between Bunzō and Osei are now extinct.

Part Three

Bunzō, treated disdainfully by both Omasa and Osei, considers moving out of his uncle's house and has even found a small apartment to rent, but can't bring himself to take final steps. His attempt to explain himself to Osei is angrily fended off by her. Noboru has started giving English lessons to his supervisor's wife and sister-in-law, and when he shows up for his now less frequent visits, he is more involved in discussing business affairs with Omasa than in speaking to Osei. Osei tries to attract his attention with an increasingly childlike behaviour, but eventually loses interest in him and convinces her mother to pay her knitting lessons. Meanwhile, Bunzō has come to the conviction that Osei is in danger of taking a downhill route under Omasa's influence and that someone has to save her. During one of their next encounters, Osei, while getting ready to go to the public bath with the maid, gives him a sympathetic glance instead of a contemptuous one like in the past weeks. Bunzō decides that he will try to talk to her once more upon her return and, in case that he fails again to make her listen, will leave the house once and for all.

== Background ==
With his debut novel Ukigumo, Futabatei aimed at incorporating everyday, colloquial language and in-depth characterisation to achieve a greater realism, a result of lengthy discussions between him and critic Shōyō Tsubouchi who advocated a new Japanese literature. Tsubouchi lent his then already prominent name to the novel, as the original publisher Kinkodo refused to print the novel with Futabatei's name on it. Futabatei was nonetheless quickly identified as the book's true author; with the publication of the second part, he was billed as "co-author". The first two parts were released in book form, the third and final part serialised in the magazine Miyako no hana, also a Kinkodo publication.

Despite the novel's sudden and open ending, it was regarded as complete by critics and readers in the years after its publication. The last chapter closed with the line "end", and a remaining element of uncertainty was not new to Japanese literature. However, in 1937, critic Izumi Yanagida brought on the possibility that the novel might have been left unfinished, referring to an 1897 interview with Futabatei. In this interview, Futabatei had spoken of an original plot outline which had Noboru win Osei, only to desert her and marry his chief's sister-in-law instead. In Futabatei's posthumously discovered journals, four more plot outlines had been sketched by him, but none of these had been realised.

Although the influence of Ivan Goncharov's 1859 novel Oblomov on Ukigumo has been repeatedly pointed out by literary scholars, translator Marleigh Grayer Ryan stressed out the many differences between the books: for instance, Futabatei's protagonist is a member of the lower class, not the aristocracy, does not feel any nostalgia for the old times, and is only temporarily inactive due to his current unemployment, not continuously by "self-induced pathological inertia" (Ryan).

While Ukigumo was highly successful with critics and readers, Futabatei was unsatisfied with the result, feeling that he had fallen behind his intended goal and failed as a writer. He stopped writing fiction for years, instead taking a job at the government gazette Kanpō.

== English translation ==
- Japan's First Modern Novel: Ukigumo of Futabatei Shimei. Translated by Ryan, Marleigh Grayer. New York: Columbia University Press. 1967.

== Adaptations ==
Ukigumo has been adapted for Japanese television in 1994 and 2016.
