= Germaine Marie-Thérèse Hannevart =

Belgian teacher and peace campaigner (1887–1977)

- Born: 8 August 1887; Leuze-en-Hainaut, Wallonia, Belgium
- Died: 24 April 1977 (aged 89)
- Education: Université libre de Bruxelles
- Employer: Émile Jacqmain High School
- Organization(s): International Federation of University Women (IFUW); Belgian Federation of University Women (FBFU); Porte Ouverte; Comité Mondial des Femmes contre la Guerre et le Fascisme (CMF); Office Internationale pour l’Enfance (OIE)

Germaine Marie-Thérèse Hannevart (8 August 1887 – 24 April 1977) was a Belgian biology teacher and women's rights activist. She became a pacifist and peace campaigner after her fiancé was killed in World War I. She was co-founder of the Belgian branch of the Comité Mondial des Femmes contre la Guerre et le Fascisme (CMF) [fr] and was head of the Belgian branch of the Office Internationale pour l’Enfance (OIE).

== Biography ==
Hannevart was born on 8 August 1887 in Leuze-en-Hainaut, Wallonia, Belgium. A younger sister called Constance was born the following year in Quiévrain. Their father was Auguste Hannevart, a teacher and education inspector.

Hannevart became a pacifist after her fiancé was killed in World War I. In 1949, Hannevart stated that "War is repugnant because it has measured all stupidity."

Hannevart was interest in bacteriology. She studied biology at the Université libre de Bruxelles (ULB) and graduated in 1922. After graduating, Hannevart taught at the prestigious Émile Jacqmain High School in Brussels.

Hannevart was a member of the International Federation of University Women (IFUW, now Graduate Women International). She was a founding member of the Belgian Federation of University Women (FBFU) in 1921, became treasurer in 1922, vice-president from 1924 to 1931 and president from 1932 to 1950.

Hannevart was the co-founder of the Belgian branch of the Comité Mondial des Femmes contre la Guerre et le Fascisme (CMF), established after the World Conference of Women against War and Fascism was held in 1934 in Paris, France. In 1935, Hannevart visited the Soviet Union.

Hannevart was head of the Belgian branch of the Office Internationale pour l’Enfance (OIE), which was responsible for the reception of refugee children exiled in Ghent during the Spanish Civil War and placing them with Belgian families. A poster preserved by the Brussels City Archives and her friendship with resistance leader Yvonne Jospa suggests that Hannevart also worked for Jewish children in some way during World War II.

Hannevart was a member of Porte Ouverte, the Belgian branch of Open Door International (ODI), which campaigned for educational and workers rights for women. She was chair from 1939 to 1956 and was a close friend of the organisation secretary Adèle Hauwel. With Porte Ouverte, she campaigned against legislation introduced by Cyrille Van Overbergh [nl], Georges Rutten [nl] and Paul Segers [nl] which aimed to restrict married women's employment opportunities.

Hannevart died on 24 April 1977, aged 89. Her archives are held in the library of her alma mater, the Université libre de Bruxelles (ULB).
