= Futabatei Shimei =

Japanese author, translator and literary critic

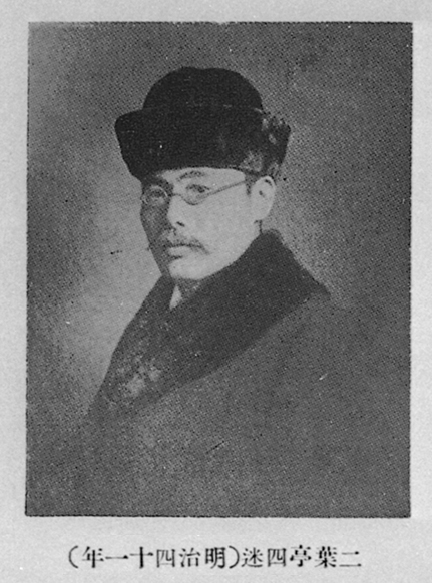
- Futabatei Shimei in 1908
- Born: 4 April 1864; Edo, Japan
- Died: 10 May 1909 (aged 45); Bay of Bengal
- Occupations: Writer, translator, literary critic
- Writing career
- Genres: Short stories, novels, essays
- Literary movement: Realism

Futabatei Shimei (二葉亭 四迷; 4 April 1864 – 10 May 1909) was a Japanese writer, translator, and literary critic. His writings are in the realist style popular in the mid to late 19th century. His work The Drifting Cloud (Ukigumo, 1887) is widely regarded as Japan's first modern novel.

== Biography ==
Futabatei was born Hasegawa Tatsunosuke in Edo (now Tokyo). After quitting his studies at the Russian language department at the Tokyo Foreign Language School in protest over administrative restructuring, Futabatei published the literary criticism Shōsetsu Sōron at the encouragement of the critic and author Tsubouchi Shōyō in 1886. Futabatei's first novel Ukigumo is often said to be unfinished, but its realist style strongly influenced fellow authors in his day. Futabatei was accomplished in Russian and translated the work of Ivan Turgenev and other Russian realists into Japanese.

In 1902, he learned Esperanto in Russia. Returning to Japan in 1906, he published the first Japanese-Esperanto instruction book Sekaigo.

Futabatei died of tuberculosis on the Bay of Bengal while returning from Russia as a special correspondent for the Asahi Shimbun newspaper. He was cremated and buried in Singapore.

The origin of Futabatei's pen name (a reference to "kutabatte shimae", lit. "drop dead") has been the repeated subject of speculation (including the allegation that these had been his father's words when he learned of his son's plans to study literature). Futabatei claimed that these were the words of his inner voice while in conflict between his artistic ideals and monetary aspirations.

== Works ==
=== Novels ===
- 1887: Ukigumo (浮雲)
- 1906: An Adopted Husband (其面影, Sono Omokage)
- 1907: Heibon (平凡)

=== Essays ===
- 1885: Bijutsu no hongi
- 1886: Shōsetsu Sōron (小説総論)
