= Tsubouchi Shōyō =

Japanese author and playwright (1859–1935)

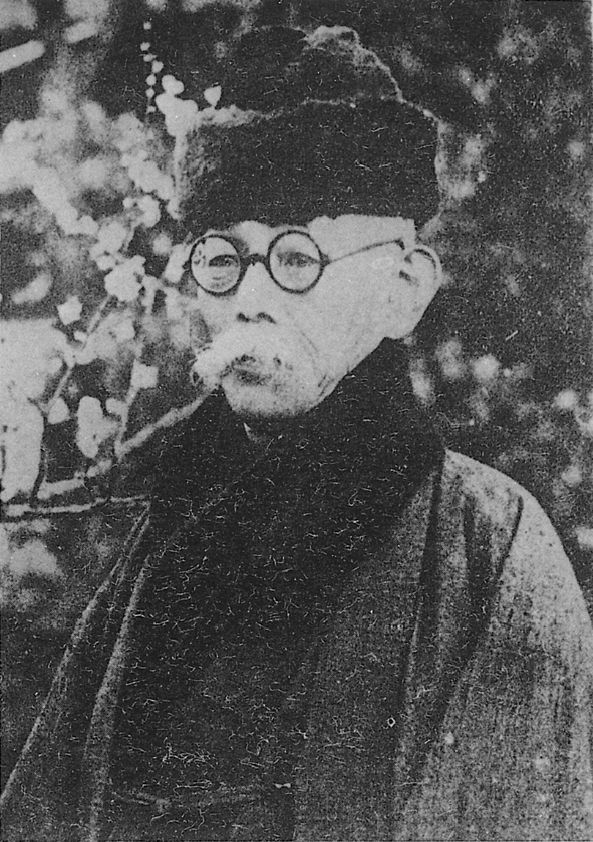
Tsubouchi Shōyō

Tsubouchi Shōyō (Note: Japanese pronunciation: [tsɯ.boꜜ.ɯ.tɕi, tsɯ.boꜜ.ɯ.tɕi̥ | ɕoꜜː.joː, tsɯ.bo.ɯ.tɕi̥ ɕoꜜː.joː, tsɯ.boꜜ.ɯ.tɕi̥ (|) ɕoː.joː]) (坪内 逍遥; May 22, 1859 – February 28, 1935) was a Japanese author, critic, playwright, translator, editor, educator, and professor at Waseda University. He has been referred to as a seminal figure in Japanese drama.

== Biography ==
He was born Tsubouchi Yūzō (坪内 雄蔵), in Gifu prefecture. He also used the pen name Harunoya Oboro (春のや おぼろ).

His book of criticism, Shōsetsu Shinzui (小説神髓; transl. The Essence of the Novel), helped free novels and dramas from the low opinion that the Japanese had of such literature. Tsubouchi's writings on realism in literature influenced Masaoka Shiki's ideas about realism in haiku. Tsubouchi's novel, Tōsei Shosei Katagi (當世書生氣質; transl. Portraits of Contemporary Students), was one of the earliest modern novels in Japan.

His Kabuki play Kiri Hitoha (桐一葉; transl. A Paulownia Leaf) was influenced by his studies of both the famous Kabuki and Jōruri (puppet theater) dramatist Chikamatsu Monzaemon and William Shakespeare. The play, in turn, influenced modern Kabuki. He also did a complete translation of the plays of Shakespeare, written in the old-fashion language of Kabuki.

His modern play, Shinkyoku Urashima (新曲浦島), incorporating traditional dance and music, was a popular and critical success. The play was a retelling of a familiar Japanese folk-tale with a Rip Van Winkle-like protagonist, Urashima Tarō.

Besides Shakespeare, he also translated a number of other works from English into Japanese, including Sir Walter Scott's The Bride of Lammermoor (春風情話, Shunpū Jōwa) and Bulwer-Lytton's novel Rienzi, the Last of the Roman Tribunes (慨世士傳, Gaiseishiden).

Tsubouchi founded and edited the periodical Waseda Bungaku (早稲田文学; transl. Waseda Literature), which published from 1891 to 1898. Tsubouchi is also noted for the long running ronsō (literary dispute) that he carried on with Mori Ōgai.

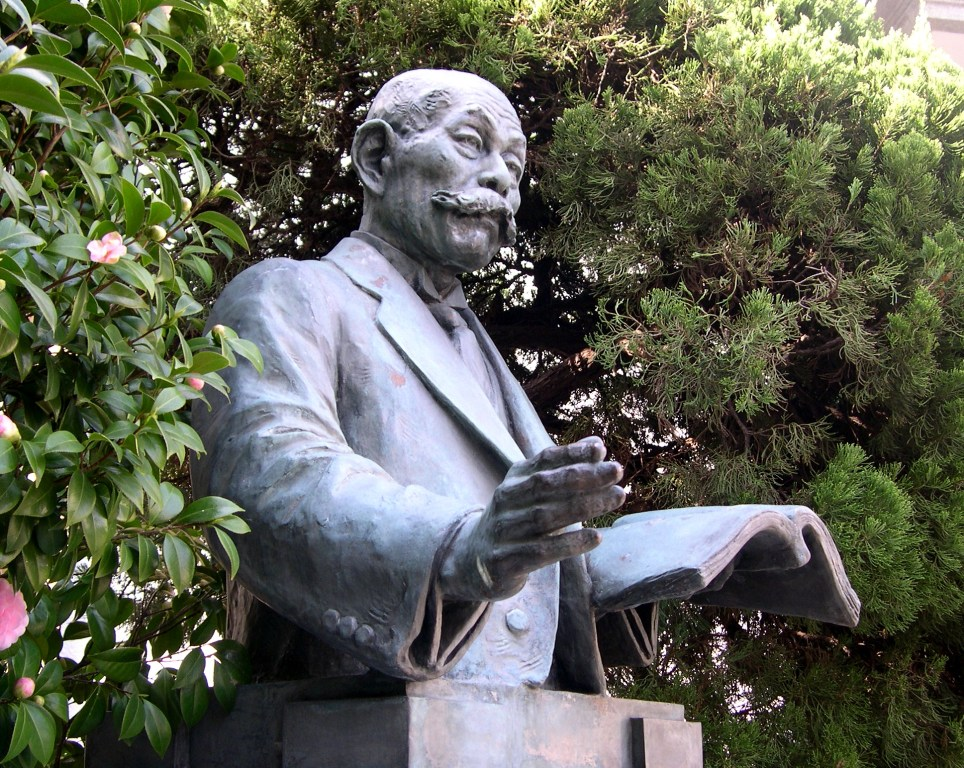
Bust of Tsubouchi Shōyō at the Tsubouchi Memorial Theatre Museum, which was named in his honour

The Waseda University Tsubouchi Memorial Theatre Museum was named in his honour and houses a large collection of his works. A bronze bust of him was also placed there.

== Works ==
=== Criticism ===
- Shōsetsu Shinzui (The Essence of the Novel) (1885)

=== Novel ===
- Tōsei Shosei Katagi (Portraits of Contemporary Students) (1885)
- Saikun (1889)

=== Kabuki plays ===
- Kiri Hitoha (A Paulownia Leaf) written 1894-5, and performed in 1904
- Maki no Kata (1896)
- Hototogisu Kojō no Rakugetsu (The Sinking Moon over the Lonely Castle Where the Cuckoo Cries) (1897)

=== Modern dramas ===
- Shinkyoku Urashima (The New Urashima) (1904)
- En no Gyōja (En the Ascetic) (1916)

== See also ==
- Futabatei Shimei
- Japanese literature
- Hagiwara Hiromichi—works
