= Converb =

Adverbial form of verb (adverb constructed from verbs)

In theoretical linguistics, a converb (abbreviated cvb) is a nonfinite verb form that serves to express adverbial subordination: notions like 'when', 'because', 'after' and 'while'. Other terms that have been used to refer to converbs include adverbial participle, conjunctive participle, gerund, gerundive and verbal adverb.

Converbs are differentiated from coverbs, verbs in complex predicates in languages that have the serial verb construction.

Converbs can be observed in most Turkic languages, Mongolic languages, as well as in all language families of Siberia such as Tungusic.

== Etymology ==
The term was coined for Khalkha Mongolian by Ramstedt (1902) and until recently, it was used mostly by specialists of Mongolic and Turkic languages to describe non-finite verbs that could be used for both coordination and subordination. Nedjalkov & Nedjalkov (1987) first adopted the term for general typological use, followed by Haspelmath & König (1995).

== Description ==
A converb depends syntactically on another verb form, but is not its argument. It can be an adjunct, an adverbial, but it cannot be the only predicate of a simple sentence or clausal argument. It cannot depend on predicates such as 'order' (Nedjalkov 1995: 97–136).

=== Examples ===
- On being elected president, he moved with his family to the capital.
- He walks the streets eating cakes.

== Khalkha Mongolian ==
хүн инээж эхэлмэгц зүрх анхандаа хүчтэй цохилж аажмаар цохилтын хэм нэг хэвэнд ордог байна.
hün inee-ž ehel-megc zürh anh-and-aa hüčtej cohil-ž aažmaar cohilt-yn hem neg hev-end or-dog baj-na.
human laugh-ž begin-megc heart first-DAT-REFL.POSS strong beat-ž slowly beat-GEN rhythm one form-DAT enter-HAB.PTCP be-NPAST
"As soon as a human begins to laugh, at first his heart beats strong, and slowly the rhythm of the beat assumes one (continuous) form."

The converb -megc denotes that as soon as the first action has been begun/completed, the second action begins. Thus, the subordinate sentence can be understood as a temporal adverbial. There is no context in which the argument structure of another verb or construction would require -megc to appear, and there is no way (possibly except for afterthought) in which a -megc-clause could come sentence-final. Thus, -megc qualifies as a converb in the general linguistic sense.

However, from the viewpoint of Mongolian philology (and quite in agreement with Nedjalkov 1995 and Johanson 1995), there is a second converb in this sentence: -ž. At its first occurrence, it is modified by the coverb ehel- ‘to begin’ and this coverb determines that the modified verb has to take the suffix. Yet, the same verbal suffix is used after the verb ‘to beat’ which ends an independent non-finite clause that temporally precedes the following clause but without modifying it in any way that would be fit for an adverbial. It would be possible for -ž to mark an adverbial:

Би … хүмүүсийн татгалзахыг тэвчиж чадахгүй гэж айж зарж эхэлсэн.
Bi … hümüüs-ijn tatgalza-h-yg tevči-ž čada-h-güj gež aj-ž zar-ž ehel-sen.
I {} people-GEN hesitate-FUT.PTCP-ACC bear-ž can-FUT.PTCP-NEG that fear-ž sell-ž begin-PAST
"I started my business, at the very beginning fearing that... I wouldn’t be able to bear the hesitating of the people."

Such "polyfunctionality" is common. Japanese and Korean could provide similar examples, and the definition of subordination poses further problems. There are linguists who suggest that a reduction of the domain of the term converb to adverbials does not fit language reality (e.g., Slater 2003: 229).

== Standard Uzbek ==
Mostly, Uzbek converbs can be translated into English as gerunds, but the context is important as the translation has to be changed as per the former. For example, below are the two sentences including the converb turib from the verb stem tur- 'stand':

Buni turib yozgan esangizlar.
If you wrote it standing.

Alternatively, turib may denote the meaning of “then” i.e., consecutiveness, so the sentence in this case can be translated as “If you stood up (and) then wrote it”. But in the second example below the same converb turib can in no way be translated either with gerunditive or consecutive meaning:

Uydan chiqmasimizdan turib ketib boʻlishibdi.
They have gone out before we left (our) home.
