= Ground truth =

Information provided by direct observation

Ground truth is information that is known to be real or true, provided by direct observation and measurement (i.e. empirical evidence) as opposed to information provided by inference. The term ground truth appeared in remote sensing literature as early as 1972, when NASA described it as essential "data about ... materials on the earth's surface" used to calibrate measurements. It was later adopted by the statistical modeling and machine learning communities. It is also commonly used to refer to information acquired by direct observation to inform immediate decisions in domains where remote sensing equipment is employed but is imperfect or inconclusive, often in urgent contexts.

== Etymology ==
The Oxford English Dictionary (s.v. ground truth) records the use of the word Groundtruth in the sense of 'fundamental truth' from Henry Ellison's poem "The Siberian Exile's Tale", published in 1833.

== Usage ==
The term "ground truth" can be used as a noun, adjective, and verb.

- Noun: "ground truth" (no hyphen). Example: "The ground truth is essential for training accurate models."
- Adjective: "ground-truth" (hyphenated compound adjective). Example: "We need to use ground-truth data to validate the model."
- Verb: "to ground-truth" or "to groundtruth" (compound verb,). Example: "We need to ground-truth the results to ensure their accuracy."

== Statistics and machine learning ==
In statistics and machine learning, ground truth is the ideal expected result, used in statistical models to prove or disprove research hypotheses. "Ground truthing" is the process of gathering the good data for this test. Ground truth is typically included in labeled data.

In machine learning, "ground truth" is not necessarily objectively correct or true. For example, in training AI models or relevance rankers, it may be a set of judgments made by people or inferred from user behavior, which may depend on context. For example, in Bayesian spam filtering, a supervised learning system is typically trained by examples labeled as spam and non-spam. Although these labels may be subjective or inaccurate, they are considered ground truth.

True ground truth in machine learning is objective data. For example, suppose we are testing a stereo vision system to see how well it can estimate 3D positions. A calibrated laser rangefinder may provide accurate distances as ground truth.

== Remote sensing ==
In remote sensing, "ground truth" refers to information collected at the imaged location. Ground truth allows image data to be related to real features and materials on the ground. The collection of ground truth data enables calibration of remote-sensing data, and aids in the interpretation and analysis of what is being sensed. Examples include cartography, meteorology, analysis of aerial photographs, satellite imagery and other techniques in which data are gathered at a distance.

More specifically, ground truth may refer to a process in which "pixels" on a satellite image are compared to what is imaged (at the time of capture) in order to verify the contents of the "pixels" in the image (noting that the concept of "pixel" is imaging-system-dependent). In the case of a classified image, supervised classification can help to determine the accuracy of the classification by the remote sensing system which can minimize error in the classification.

Ground truth is usually done on site, correlating what is known with surface observations and measurements of various properties of the features of the ground resolution cells under study in the remotely sensed digital image. The process also involves taking geographic coordinates of the ground resolution cell with GPS technology and comparing those with the coordinates of the "pixel" being studied provided by the remote sensing software to understand and analyze the location errors and how it may affect a particular study.

Ground truth is important in the initial supervised classification of an image. When the identity and location of land cover types are known through a combination of field work, maps, and personal experience these areas are known as training sites. The spectral characteristics of these areas are used to train the remote sensing software using decision rules for classifying the rest of the image. These decision rules such as Maximum Likelihood Classification, Parallelopiped Classification, and Minimum Distance Classification offer different techniques to classify an image. Additional ground truth sites allow the remote sensor to establish an error matrix that validates the accuracy of the classification method used. Different classification methods may have different percentages of error for a given classification project. It is important that the remote sensor chooses a classification method that works best with the number of classifications used while providing the least amount of error.

Ground truth also helps with atmospheric correction. Since images from satellites have to pass through the atmosphere, they can get distorted because of absorption in the atmosphere. So ground truth can help fully identify objects in satellite photos.

=== Errors of commission ===
An example of an error of commission is when a pixel reports the presence of a feature (such a tree) that, in reality, is absent (no tree is actually present). Ground truthing ensures that the error matrices have a higher accuracy percentage than would be the case if no pixels were ground-truthed. This value is the complement of the user's accuracy, i.e. Commission Error = 1 - user's accuracy.

=== Errors of omission ===
An example of an error of omission is when pixels of a certain type, for example, maple trees, are not classified as maple trees. The process of ground-truthing helps to ensure that the pixel is classified correctly and the error matrices are more accurate. This value is the complement of the producer's accuracy, i.e. Omission Error = 1 - producer's accuracy

== Geographical information systems ==
The ground truth representations are the GIS elements (fields or objects), and each element is representing (by a cartographic process) a real world object.

In GIS the spatial data is modeled as field (like in remote sensing raster images) or as object (like in vectorial map representation). They are modeled from the real world (also named geographical reality), typically by a cartographic process (illustrated).

Geographic information systems such as GIS, GPS, and GNSS, have become so widespread that the term "ground truth" has taken on special meaning in that context. If the location coordinates returned by a location method such as GPS are an estimate of a location, then the "ground truth" is the actual location on Earth. A smart phone might return a set of estimated location coordinates such as 43.87870, −103.45901. The ground truth being estimated by those coordinates is the tip of George Washington's nose on Mount Rushmore. The accuracy of the estimate is the maximum distance between the location coordinates and the ground truth. We could say in this case that the estimate accuracy is 10 meters, meaning that the point on Earth represented by the location coordinates is thought to be within 10 meters of George's nose—the ground truth. In slang, the coordinates indicate where we think George Washington's nose is located, and the ground truth is where it really is. In practice a smart phone or hand-held GPS unit is routinely able to estimate the ground truth within 6–10 meters. Specialized instruments can reduce GPS measurement error to under a centimeter.

== Military usage ==
US military slang uses "ground truth" to refer to the facts comprising a tactical situation—as opposed to intelligence reports, mission plans, and other descriptions reflecting the conative or policy-based projections of the industrial·military complex. The term appears in the title of the Iraq War documentary film The Ground Truth (2006), and also in military publications, for example Stars and Stripes saying: "Stripes decided to figure out what the ground truth was in Iraq."

== See also ==
- Baseline (science)
- Calibration
- Foundationalism
