= Stretched verb =

Complex predicate composed of a light verb and an eventive noun

A stretched verb is a complex predicate composed of a light verb and an eventive aspect noun. An example is the English phrase "take a bite out of", which is semantically similar to the simple verb "bite". The concept has been used in studies of German and English.

Other names for a stretched verb include "supported verb", "expanded predicate", "verbo-nominal phrase", and "delexical verb combination". Some definitions may place further restrictions on the construction: restricting the light verb to one of a fixed list; restricting the occurrence of articles, prepositions, or adverbs within the complex phrase; requiring the eventive noun to be identical or cognate with a synonymous simple verb; or at least requiring the stretched verb to be synonymous with some simple verb.

In English, many stretched verbs are more common than a corresponding simple verb such as "get rid [of X from Y]" compared to the verb "rid [Y of X]"; or "offer (one's) condolences [to X]" vs "condole [with X]". Correct use of stretched verbs is about as difficult for EFL students as other types of collocation.

== See also ==
- Light verb
- Phrasal verb
