= Compound verb =

Multi-word compound that functions as a single verb

In linguistics, a compound verb or complex predicate is a multi-word compound that functions as a single verb. One component of the compound is a light verb or vector, which carries any inflections, indicating tense, mood, or aspect, but provides only fine shades of meaning. The other, "primary", component is a verb or noun which carries most of the semantics of the compound, and determines its arguments. It is usually in either base or [in Verb + Verb compounds] conjunctive participial form.

A compound verb is also called a "complex predicate" because the semantics, as formally modeled by a predicate, is determined by the primary verb, though both verbs appear in the surface form. Whether Noun+Verb (N+V) compounds are considered to be "compound verbs" is a matter of naming convention. Generally, the term complex predicate usually includes N+V compounds, whereas the term compound verb is usually reserved for V+V compounds. However, several authors [especially Iranists] refer to N+V compounds as compound verbs.

Compound verbs are to be distinguished from serial verbs which typically signify a sequence of actions, and in which the verbs are relatively equal in semantic and grammatical weight. They are also to be distinguished from sequences of auxiliary plus main verbs.

== Structure ==
Thus, there are two classes of complex predicates:

1. V+V compounds: One type of compound verb, where the second verb (rarely the first...) is a "light verb" (LV) is preceded by (rarely followed by ...) a primary or "heavy verb". With a few exceptions all V+V compound verbs alternate with their simple counterparts. That is, removing the light verb / vector does not affect grammaticality at all nor the meaning very much: निकल गया – نِکَل گَیا "nikal gayā" {exit + WENT} versus निकला – نِکلا nikalā {exited}, both meaning '(I/you/he) went out.' In a few languages both components of the compound verb can be finite forms: Kurukh kecc-ar ker-ar lit. "died-3pl went-3pl" '(They) died.'
2. N+V compounds: A compound with Noun+verb, converting the noun into a verbal structure; the arguments and the semantics are determined by the N and the tense markers / inflections are carried by the V, especially with LVs such as "do," "take," "give," etc. Examples in English include stretched verb examples like take a walk or commit suicide. Some of the verbs participating in N+V compounds also participate as LVs in V+V compounds. [However, the common verb "do" rarely participates as LV in V+V compounds.] Unlike V+V compounds, N+V compounds appear in almost all languages of the world.

== Languages with compound verbs ==
Compound verbs of both types (V+V and N+V) are very common in all the languages of India, though V+V compounds are more frequent in the northern Indo-Aryan languages than in Dravidian languages. In addition to South Asian languages, V+V compounds occur in Turkic languages like Uzbek, Kyrgyz and Uyghur, in Tibeto-Burman languages like Limbu and Newari, in Korean and Japanese, in northeast Caucasian languages like Tsez and Avar, and in Quichua, a variety of Quechua. The Indo-European language Greek also possesses some verb–verb compounds. V+V compounds do not occur in Iranian languages. What are called "compound verbs" by Iranists are N+V compounds.

=== English ===
The English lexicon contains a few true compound verbs, such as stirfry, kickstart and forcefeed. These are not serial verbs – though, as with many compounds, they may be spelled as two words (or hyphenated). Rather, the first verb expresses how the action expressed by the second verb is carried out. The second verb is the only one which may express tense.

English also expresses aspectual distinctions as to the beginning, duration, completion, or repetition of an action using auxiliaries. Examples here include was starting, had lived, had been seen, etc. These sequences function in place of morphologically complex predicates like the inchoative or inceptive stems of Latin (amo, 'I love'; amasco, 'I'm starting to love', 'I'm falling in love'; florere, 'to flower'; florescere, 'to start flowering'; etc.), and of Russian (smeyat'sya, смеяться, 'to laugh'; zasmeyat'sya засмеяться, 'to start laughing').

Though verb + verb compounds are rare in English, one may illustrate the form with the example "to go crashing [through the door]". In some interpretations, one may consider "go" as a light verb, which carries markers like tense. However, the main part of the meaning, as well as the arguments, i.e. answers to questions such as who? (agent) or what was it that "went crashing"? (subject), are determined by the second, semantically primary verb, "crash". "Go" carries plural/tense markers (they go | he goes crashing), whereas "crashing" appears in this fixed form and does not change with tense, number, gender, etc. Whether gerundive forms like "went crashing" are compound verbs is controversial in English; many linguists prefer to treat "crashing" as a nominal in its gerundive form. However, the compound verb treatment may have some advantages, particularly when it comes to semantic analysis. For example, in response to She went crashing, the question "Where did she go?" is less revealing than "Where did she go crashing?".

English has many examples of noun + verb compound predicates, called stretched verbs, which combine a light verb with an "eventive" noun (an action-describing noun which can also operate as a verb, though it may have become an uncommon one), or with a noun phrase composed of such a noun and one or more prepositions. Common examples include: to offer [one's] condolences, to take a bite out of, and to get rid of (while to rid and to condole are infrequent).

Sometimes examples labeled serial verbs turn out to be compound verbs, as in "What did you go and do that for?" and "Your business might just get up and leave."

Another variety of open-compound verb is common in English, German, and some other languages: The phrasal verb is in one in which a verb word and a preposition, particle, or both act together as a unit which does not convey what the words would indicate when taken literally. Examples include to think something over, to look forward to something, and to look up something in a dictionary (contrast the literal and non-compound look up the chimney).

A dictionary comparison reveals that compound verbs of some sorts are more frequent in American English than in British English.

=== Hindi-Urdu ===
Compound verbs are very common in Indo-Aryan languages, such as Hindustani and Punjabi, where as many as 20% of the verb forms in running text may be compounds.

For example, in Hindi-Urdu, nikal gayā (निकल गया, نِکَل گَیا, lit. "exit went") means 'went out', while nikal paṛā (निकल पड़ा, نِکَل پَڑا, lit. "exit fell") means 'departed' or 'was blurted out'. In these examples nikal (निकल, نِکَل, lit. "exit") is the primary verb, and gayā (गया, گَیا, lit. "went") and paṛā (पड़ा, پَڑا, lit. "fell") are the vectors or "light verbs". Compound verbs in Hindi-Urdu have the additional property of alternation. That is, under partly specifiable conditions [such as negation] compound verbs like nikal gayā and nikal paṛā are replaced with a non-compound counterpart [niklā, निकला, نِکلا ] with little or no change in meaning. However, the phenomenon of alternation is not found in all languages that have compound verbs.

The Noun + Verb complex predicates are a quite different matter. There is no alternation with a simplex counterpart and in approximately half of all Hind-Urdui N+V compound verbs karnā ( करना, کَرنا, lit. "to do") is the light verb, and in another 20% use hōnā (होना, ہونا, lit. "to be") is the light verb. A significant number use khānā (खाना, کهانا, lit. "to eat"). However, the verb karnā and khānā never occur as second elements in a Verb + Verb compound.

=== Persian ===
Persian makes extensive use of N+V compound verbs. The meaning of compound verbs in Persian is sometimes distinct from the connotation of either the verbal or non-verbal component. The most common verbal element used in Persian compound verbs is كردن kardan ('to do/make'), e.g. فكر كردن fekr kardan ('to think'). Other common verbal elements include دادن dādan ('to give'), e.g. انجام دادن anjām dādan ('to perform'); گرفتن gereftan ('to take'), e.g. جشن گرفتن jashn gereftan ('to celebrate'); زدن zadan ('to hit'), e.g. حرف زدن harf zadan ('to speak'); and داشتن dāshtan ('to have'), e.g. دوست داشتن dust dāshtan ('to like').

The verbal element of Persian compound verbs takes inflection for person, tense, and mood.

فكر می كنم
fekr mi konam
thought PRES do-I
'I think'

آنها با من حرف زدند
ānhā ba man harf zadand
they to me speech PAST-hit-they
'They spoke to me'

!جشن بگیرید
jashn begirid!
celebration IMP-take-you.PL
'celebrate!'

=== Japanese ===
Japanese has many compound verbs, reflecting the agglutinative nature of modern as well as Old Japanese.

In both English start reading and Japanese 読み始める yomihajimeru "read-CONJUNCTIVE-start" "start reading," the phrasal verbs start and 始める hajimeru "start" change according to tense, negation, and the like while the main verbs reading and 読み yomi "reading" usually remain the same. An exception to this is the passive voice, in which both English and Japanese modify the main verb: start to be read and 読まれ始める yomarehajimeru lit. "read-PASSIVE-(CONJUNCTIVE)-start" start to be read. Of course, "hajimeru" still changes according to tense, mood, negation, and the like.

Some Japanese compounds have undergone grammaticalisation, as reflected in the orthography. Many Japanese serial verbs are formed by connecting two verbs, as in "go and ask" (行って聞く, ittekiku), and in Japanese orthography lexical items are generally written with kanji (here 行く and 聞く), while grammatical items are more likely to be written with hiragana [as in the compound verb "faded away" (消えていった, kiete itta). Serial verbs are thus generally written with a kanji for each constituent verb, but some of the second verbs in other compounds, having become grammaticalized, are often written using hiragana, such as "try out, see" (〜みる, -miru), from "see" (見る, miru), as in "try eating (it) and see" (食べてみる, tabetemiru) and "do something regrettable" (〜しまう, -shimau), from "put away" (仕舞う, shimau), as in "I mistakenly fell in love" (愛してしまった, aishiteshimatta).

Only native Japanese verbs (yamatokotoba verbs) can be used as light verbs or vectors in this way. Such verbs comprise a small closed class. Borrowed words, which can be used as verbs by combining them with the auxiliary verb -suru (〜する; to do), do not occur as the second element in compound verbs. For example, the Sino-Japanese verb "to love" (愛する, ai suru) itself can be modified, as in "to try loving" (愛してみる, ai shitemiru), but it does not combine with another verb as its second or modifying element.

Japanese i-adjectives, which function grammatically as non-finite verbs, can also compound, functioning as compound modifiers, but that is less common than for verbs. (See Japanese adjectives for details.)

=== Kichwa-influenced Spanish ===
Under the influence of a Kichwa substrate, speakers living in the Ecuadorian Altiplano have innovated compound verbs in Spanish.

De rabia puso rompiendo la olla.
from anger put breaking the pot
'In anger (he/she) smashed the pot.'

Botaremos matándote.
[we] will throw kill-you
'We will kill you.'
(n Kichwa: huañuchi-shpa shitashun)

In conformity with the SVO language word order of Spanish, the vector precedes the main verb while in SOV language Kichwa, the vector follows the main verb.

=== Greek (modern) ===
The compound verbs of modern Greek are formed as other compounds in the language, creating a compound stem by prefixing the stem of a second verb to another verb with the compounding interfix -o-. Although only the second verb is inflected, the typical Greek compound verb is a coordinative compound formed by two semantically opposed, equal verbs, and in semantic terms neither can be nominated the compound head with the other as a dependent. The action expressed by the verb is semantically equal to using both verbs individually, linked by a conjunction. Examples: μπαίν-ω ['beno] 'I go in' + βγαίν-ω ['vjeno] 'I come out' = μπαινοβγαίνω [beno'vjeno] 'I go in and out'; ανάβ-ω [a'navo] 'I light up' σβήν-ω ['zvino] 'I put out (a light)' = αναβοσβήνω [anavo'zvino] 'I flash on and off'. These compound verbs are of the dvandva type. Semantically they equal the phrases μπαίνω και βγαίνω 'I go in and go out', ανάβω και σβήνω 'I light up and put out'.

=== Israeli Hebrew ===
Unlike Classical Hebrew, Israeli Hebrew is abundant with V+N compound verbs. Consider the following pairs in which the first is an Israeli Hebrew compound verb and the last is a Classical Hebrew synthetic form:

1. שם צעקה sam tseaká “shouted” (which literally means “put a shout”) vis-à-vis צעק tsaák “shouted”
2. נתן מבט natán mabát “looked” (which literally means “gave a look”) or העיף מבט heíf mabát “looked” (literally “flew/threw a look”; cf. the English expressions cast a glance, threw a look and tossed a glance) vis-à-vis the Hebrew-descent הביט hibít “looked at”.

According to Ghil'ad Zuckermann, the Israeli V+N compound verb is employed here for the desire to express swift action, and stems from Yiddish. He compares the Israeli periphrasis to the following Yiddish expressions all meaning “to have a look”:

1. געבן א קוק gebn a kuk, which literally means “to give a look”
2. טאן א קוק ton a kuk, which literally means “to do a look”
3. the colloquial expression כאפן א קוק khapn a kuk, which literally means “to catch a look”.

Zuckermann argues that the Israeli V+N compound verbs “are not nonce, ad hoc lexical calques of Yiddish. The Israeli system is productive and the lexical realization often differs from that of Yiddish”. He provides the following Israeli examples:

1. הרביץ hirbíts “hit, beat; gave”, yielded
  1. הרביץ מהירות hirbíts mehirút “drove very fast” (מהירות mehirút meaning “speed”), and
  2. הרביץ ארוחה hirbíts arukhá “ate a big meal” (ארוחה arukhá meaning “meal”), cf. English hit the buffet “eat a lot at the buffet”; hit the liquor/bottle “drink alcohol”.

The Israeli Hebrew compound verb דפק הופעה dafák hofaá, which literally means “hit a show”, actually means “dressed smartly”.

== Historical processes and grammaticalization ==
As languages change, the vector or light verb may retain its original meaning or it may undergo different degrees of bleaching, part of the process of grammaticalization.

Thus, in the Hindi-Urdu compound nikal paṛā (exit fell), paṛ- has almost none of its "fall" meaning, though some of the finality of "fall" also is transferred as a perfective aspect (through the ending -ā).

On the other hand, the Japanese "begin" はじめる (hajimeru) retains a good deal of its independent word meaning even in the compound. Contrast this with the grammaticalization of "put away"しまう (shimau), as in 愛してしまった ai shite shimatta ("I mistakenly fell in love"). A deeper degree of grammaticalization may lead to phonological changes, too - usually some kind of shortening: 愛しちゃった ai shi chatta ("Damned if I didn't fall in love!") where 〜てしま -te shima- has been replaced by ちゃ 〜chya.

In the long run, it has been suggested that LVs that are particularly frequent, may become grammaticalized, so that they may now occur systematically with other verbal constituents, so that they become an auxiliary verb (e.g. the English verb "be", as in "I am eating", or "had" in "they had finished"), or, after sound change, even a clitic (a shortened verb, as in "I'm"). In particular, some verb inflections (e.g. Latin future tense inflections) are thought to have arisen in this manner. Sanford Steever has shown the same phenomenon has a role in the emergence of the ditransitive paradigm in Dravidian.

== See also ==
- Auxiliary verb
- Compound modifier
- Converb
- Modal verb
- Periphrasis
- Phrasal verb
- Stretched verb
- Serial verb
- Verb phrase
