= Coverb =

Grammatical construct resembling a verb

A coverb is a word or prefix that resembles a verb or co-operates with a verb. In languages that use serial verb constructions, coverbs are a type of word that shares features of verbs and prepositions. A coverb takes an object or complement and forms a phrase that appears in sequence with another verb phrase in accordance with the serial construction. A coverb appears to be subordinate to a main verb and fulfills a function similar to that of a preposition.

Some words that may be classed as coverbs can also function as independent verbs, but that is not always the case. Coverbs in that sense are found in Asian languages such as Chinese and Vietnamese, and, for example, West African languages such as Yoruba. § Examples are given below.

The term coverb (like preverb) is also sometimes used to denote the first element in a compound verb or complex predicate. There, the coverb supplies significant semantic information, and the second element (a light verb) is inflected to convey mainly grammatical information. The term is used in this way in relation to, for instance, North Australian languages.

In relation to Hungarian, coverb is sometimes used to denote a verb prefix. They are elements that express meanings such as direction or completion and so have a function corresponding to that of certain types of adverbs.

== Common proverb adpositions ==
To approximate a coverb in English (after a noun), start with the verb/coverb, then append one of the adpositions below, then append the coverb/verb with the suffix "-ing" or "-ingly."

adposition type	example	class specification
if	He falls if running	condition
while	He falls while running	simultaneous/imperfective
until	He runs until falling	terminative
for/to	He runs for falling / He runs (in order) to fall	intent
because of	He falls because of running	sequential (explicit causation)
after	He falls after running	immediate (coincidental causation)
then	He runs, then falls	perfective (defies causation)
at the same place	He runs where (he) falls	location

In many languages, the adposition fuses with a verb to a coverb composite. Korean has a higher variety of adpositional coverbs.

== In Chinese ==
The following examples demonstrate the usage of coverbs in Standard Chinese.

我 帮 你 找 他
我 幫 你 找 他
wǒ bāng nǐ zhǎo tā
I help you find him
"I'm finding him for you."

The above sentence represents a typical Chinese serial verb construction, with two consecutive verb phrases meaning "help you" and "find him", sharing the same subject ("I"), and essentially referring to the same action. The meaning of the "help you" phrase, however, is closer in this context to the English prepositional phrase "for you". Thus, the word bāng, while it may be analyzed as a verb meaning "help", actually has a function closer to that of a preposition meaning "for". It is words like bāng, as used in the above sentence, that are referred to as coverbs in descriptions of Chinese (and of other languages, like Vietnamese and Yoruba, which have analogous structures).

我 坐 飞机 从 上海 到 北京 去
我 坐 飛機 從 上海 到 北京 去
wǒ zuò fēijī cóng Shànghǎi dào Běijīng qù
I sit aircraft follow Shanghai arrive Beijing go
"I travel from Shanghai to Beijing by aircraft."

In the above example, there are three coverbs: zuò (here having the prepositional meaning "by (a transportation medium)"), cóng (meaning "from"), and dào (here meaning "to"), with 去 qù ("to go") at the end as the main verb. The three coverbs are also used as main verbs in other contexts, namely as "sit", "follow" and "arrive" respectively. Not all Chinese coverbs can be used as main verbs, however, especially disyllabic ones such as 根据 gēnjù ("according to"), which on the other hand can be a noun meaning "the basis, foundation (of something said)".

One important aspect about Chinese coverbs is the use of temporal order, so e.g. coverbs expressing the source of movement must appear before the coverb expressing the destination in the clause.

Since coverbs precede their complement (object) and perform essentially a prepositional function, some linguists simply refer to them as prepositions. In Chinese, they are called jiècí (介词; 介詞), a term which generally corresponds to "preposition" (or more generally, "adposition"). The situation is complicated somewhat by the fact that Chinese has location markers that appear after a noun that are often called postpositions.

The meaning of an English locational preposition is often, but not always, conveyed by a coverb and a location marker in combination, as in 在桌子上 zài zhuōzi shàng, meaning "on the table" but literally "be.at table on".
