= Compound modifier =

Compound of two or more words that collectively modify a noun

A compound modifier (also called a compound adjective, phrasal adjective, or adjectival phrase) is a compound of two or more attributive words: that is, two or more words that collectively modify a noun. Compound modifiers are grammatically equivalent to single-word modifiers and can be used in combination with other modifiers. (In the preceding sentence, "single-word" is itself a compound modifier.)

The constituents of compound modifiers need not be adjectives; combinations of nouns, determiners, and other parts of speech are also common. For example, man-eating (shark) and one-way (street). The punctuation of compound modifiers in English depends on their grammatical role. Attributive compounds—modifiers within the noun phrase—are typically hyphenated, whereas the same compounds used as predicates are typically not (if they are temporary compounds), unless they are permanent compounds attested as dictionary headwords.

== Compound adjectives ==
Words that function as compound adjectives may modify a noun or a noun phrase. Take the English examples heavy metal detector and heavy-metal detector. The former example contains only the bare adjective heavy to describe a device that is properly written as metal detector; the latter example contains the phrase heavy-metal, which is a compound noun that is ordinarily rendered as heavy metal absent an accompanying adjective. In the latter example, however, heavy-metal functions as a compound adjective that modifies the noun detector.

Whether a word sequence such as "heavy + metal + detector" implies a compound adjective + noun or bare adjective + compound noun depends on the punctuation. For instance, heavy-metal detector and heavy metal detector can refer to quite different things: heavy-metal detector implies a device that detects heavy metals (wherein heavy-metal functions as a compound adjective that modifies the noun detector). By contrast, heavy metal detector, without the hyphen, refers to a metal detector that is heavy. Heavy is a bare adjective that modifies the compound noun metal detector. Thus, heavy metal detector is a bare adjective + compound noun sequence.

A strategy to avoid conflation of compound adjective + noun versus bare adjective + compound noun sequences is to clearly distinguish the usage of an attributive adjective and a noun adjunct. Accordingly, the phrase heavy metallic detector unequivocally employs a compound adjective to describe a weighty detector made of metal.

== Hyphenation of elements in English ==
Conventionally, and with the support of modern writing guides, compound modifiers that appear before a noun phrase should include a hyphen between each word, subject to certain exceptions. Hyphens are used in this way to prevent confusion; without their use, a reader might interpret the words separately, rather than as a phrase. Hyphens join the relevant words into a single idea: a compound adjective.

A compound modifier that is spaced rather than hyphenated is referred to as an open compound.

When a numeral and a noun are used in a compound modifier that precedes a noun, the noun in the modifier takes the singular form. For example, the 2021 Belmont Stakes was a "12-furlong race" and an "eight-horse race", not a "12-furlongs race" or an "eight-horses race".

=== Exceptions ===
Major style guides advise consulting a dictionary to determine whether a compound adjective should be hyphenated; compounds entered as dictionary headwords are permanent compounds, and for these, the dictionary's hyphenation should be followed even when the compound adjective follows a noun. According to some guides, hyphens are unnecessary in familiar compounds used as adjectives "where no ambiguity could result", while other guides suggest using hyphens "generally" in such compounds used as adjectives before nouns.

It may be appropriate to distinguish between compound modifiers whose adverb has the suffix -ly, such as quickly and badly, and those whose adverb does not, such as well. The -ly suffix on an adverb allows readers to understand its lexical category (if not in the technical sense, then at least in the sense of the intended meaning), showing that it is intended to modify the adjective that it precedes and so not requiring hyphenation. Quickly and badly are unambiguously adverbs.

Other adverbs (such as well) can commonly be used as adjectives; these adverbs without the -ly suffix therefore commonly take a hyphen. For example, one could speak of a well-known actress or a little-known actress. If the compound modifier that would otherwise be hyphenated is changed to a post-modifier—one which is located after the modified noun phrase—then the hyphen is conventionally not necessary: the actress is well known.

Finally, the word very in a compound modifier is generally not accompanied by a hyphen. Where both (or all) of the words in a compound modifier are nouns, it is seen as not necessary to hyphenate them, as misunderstanding is unlikely.

=== Examples ===
- Man-eating shark (as opposed to man eating shark, which could be interpreted as a man eating the meat of a shark)
- Wild-goose chase (as opposed to wild goose chase, which could be interpreted as a goose chase that is wild)
- Long-term contract (as opposed to long term contract, which could be interpreted as a long contract about a term)
- Zero-liability protection (as opposed to zero liability protection, which could be interpreted as there being no liability protection)
- College-football-halftime controversy (as opposed to college-football halftime controversy, a controversy occurring during the halftime of a college-football match)

==== Examples using an en dash for attributive compounds ====
An en dash may be used for attributive compounds to enhance readability and eliminate ambiguity.

- Pulitzer Prize–winning novel
- New York–style pizza
- The non–San Francisco part of the world
- The post–World War II era
- Pre–Civil War era
- Academy Award–nominated actor

== Other languages ==
=== Hungarian ===
Hungarian orthography describes three types of this modification in spelling, as described in the main article.

=== Japanese ===
Japanese adjectives can compound. This is quite common for na-adjectives, which function essentially as attributive noun phrases, while it is relatively uncommon for i-adjectives, and is much less common than Japanese compound verbs. Common examples include omo-shiro-i (面白い; interesting) "face-whitening" (noun + i-adjective) and zuru-gashiko-i (狡賢い; sly) "crafty-clever" (i-adjective stem + i-adjective).
