= Part of speech =

Category of words based on shared grammatical properties in a clause

In grammar, a part of speech or part-of-speech (abbreviated as POS or PoS, also known as word class or grammatical category) is a category of words (or, more generally, of lexical items) that have similar grammatical properties. Words that are assigned to the same part of speech generally display similar syntactic behavior (they play similar roles within the grammatical structure of sentences), sometimes similar morphological behavior in that they undergo inflection for similar properties and even similar semantic behavior. Commonly listed English parts of speech are noun, verb, adjective, adverb, pronoun, preposition, conjunction, interjection, numeral, article, and determiner.

Other terms than part of speech—particularly in modern linguistic classifications, which often make more precise distinctions than the traditional scheme does—include word class, lexical class, and lexical category. Some authors restrict the term lexical category to refer only to a particular type of syntactic category; for them the term excludes those parts of speech that are considered to be function words, such as pronouns. The term form class is also used, although this has various conflicting definitions. Word classes may be classified as open or closed: open classes (typically including nouns, verbs and adjectives) acquire new members constantly, while closed classes (such as pronouns and conjunctions) acquire new members infrequently, if at all.

Almost all languages have the word classes noun and verb, but beyond these two there are significant variations among different languages. For example:

- Japanese has as many as three classes of adjectives, where English has one.
- Chinese, Korean, Japanese and Vietnamese have a class of nominal classifiers.
- Many languages do not distinguish between adjectives and adverbs, or between adjectives and verbs (see stative verb).

Because of such variation in the number of categories and their identifying properties, analysis of parts of speech must be done for each individual language. Nevertheless, the labels for each category are assigned on the basis of universal criteria.

== History ==
The classification of words into lexical categories is found from the earliest moments in the history of linguistics.

=== India ===
In the Nirukta, written in the 6th or 5th century BCE, the Sanskrit grammarian Yāska defined four main categories of words:

- नाम nāma – noun (including adjective)
- आख्यात ākhyāta – verb
- उपसर्ग upasarga – pre-verb or prefix
- निपात nipāta – particle, invariant word (perhaps preposition)

These four were grouped into two larger classes: inflectable (nouns and verbs) and uninflectable (pre-verbs and particles).

The ancient work on the grammar of the Tamil language, Tolkāppiyam, argued to have been written around 2nd century CE, classifies Tamil words as peyar (பெயர்; noun), vinai (வினை; verb), idai (part of speech which modifies the relationships between verbs and nouns), and uri (word that further qualifies a noun or verb).

=== Western tradition ===
A century or two after the work of Yāska, the Greek scholar Plato wrote in his Cratylus dialogue, "sentences are, I conceive, a combination of verbs [rhêma] and nouns [ónoma]". Aristotle added another class, "conjunction" [sýndesmos], which included not only the words known today as conjunctions, but also other parts (the interpretations differ; in one interpretation it is pronouns, prepositions, and the article).

By the end of the 2nd century BCE, grammarians had expanded this classification scheme into eight categories, seen in the Art of Grammar, attributed to Dionysius Thrax:

- 'Name' (ónoma) translated as 'noun': a part of speech inflected for case, signifying a concrete or abstract entity. It includes various species like nouns, adjectives, proper nouns, appellatives, collectives, ordinals, numerals and more.
- Verb (rhêma): a part of speech without case inflection, but inflected for tense, person and number, signifying an activity or process performed or undergone
- Participle (metokhḗ): a part of speech sharing features of the verb and the noun
- Article (árthron): a declinable part of speech, taken to include the definite article, but also the basic relative pronoun
- Pronoun (antōnymíā): a part of speech substitutable for a noun and marked for a person
- Preposition (próthesis): a part of speech placed before other words in composition and in syntax
- Adverb (epírrhēma): a part of speech without inflection, in modification of or in addition to a verb, adjective, clause, sentence, or other adverb
- Conjunction (sýndesmos): a part of speech binding together the discourse and filling gaps in its interpretation

It can be seen that these parts of speech are defined by morphological, syntactic and semantic criteria.

The Latin grammarian Priscian (fl. 500 CE) modified the above eightfold system, excluding "article" (since the Latin language, unlike Greek, does not have articles) but adding "interjection".

The Latin names for the parts of speech, from which the corresponding modern English terms derive, were nomen, verbum, participium, pronomen, praepositio, adverbium, conjunctio and interjectio. The category nomen included substantives (nomen substantivum, corresponding to what are today called nouns in English), adjectives (nomen adjectivum) and numerals (nomen numerale). This is reflected in the older English terminology noun substantive, noun adjective and noun numeral. Later the adjective became a separate class, as often did the numerals, and the English word noun came to be applied to substantives only.

=== Classification ===
Works of English grammar generally follow the pattern of the European tradition as described above, except that participles are now usually regarded as forms of verbs rather than as a separate part of speech, and numerals are often conflated with other parts of speech: nouns (cardinal numerals, e.g., "one", and collective numerals, e.g., "dozen"), adjectives (ordinal numerals, e.g., "first", and multiplier numerals, e.g., "single") and adverbs (multiplicative numerals, e.g., "once", and distributive numerals, e.g., "singly"). Eight or nine parts of speech are commonly listed:

- Noun
- Verb
- Adjective
- Adverb
- Pronoun
- Preposition
- Conjunction
- Interjection
- Determiner (Note: Some traditional classifications consider determiners to be adjectives, yielding eight parts of speech rather than nine.)

Some modern classifications include additional classes, such as particles (yes, no) (Note: Yes and no are sometimes classified as interjections.) and postpositions (ago, notwithstanding), although these categories contain a much smaller number of words.

The classification below, or slight expansions of it, is still followed in most dictionaries:

Noun (names)
a word or lexical item denoting any abstract (abstract noun: e.g. home) or concrete entity (concrete noun: e.g. house); a person (police officer, Michael), place (coastline, London), thing (necktie, television), idea (happiness), or quality (bravery). Nouns can also be classified as count nouns or non-count nouns; some can belong to either category. The most common part of speech; they are called naming words.
Pronoun (replaces or places again)
a substitute for a noun or noun phrase (them, he). Pronouns make sentences shorter and clearer since they replace nouns.
Adjective (describes, limits)
a modifier of a noun or pronoun (big, brave). Adjectives make the meaning of another word (noun) more precise.
Verb (states action or being)
a word denoting an action (walk), occurrence (happen), or state of being (be). Without a verb, a group of words cannot be a clause or sentence.
Adverb (describes, limits)
a modifier of an adjective, verb, sentence, or another adverb (very, quite). Adverbs make language more precise.
Preposition (relates)
a word that relates words to each other in a phrase or sentence and aids in syntactic context (in, of). Prepositions show the relationship between a noun or a pronoun with another word in the sentence.
Conjunction (connects)
a syntactic connector; links words, phrases, or clauses (and, but). Conjunctions connect words or group of words.
Interjection (expresses feelings and emotions)
an emotional greeting or exclamation (Huzzah, Alas). Interjections express strong feelings and emotions.
Article (describes, limits)
a grammatical marker of definiteness (the) or indefiniteness (a, an). The article is not always listed separately as its own part of speech. It is considered by some grammarians to be a type of adjective or sometimes the term 'determiner' (a broader class) is used.

English words are not generally marked as belonging to one part of speech or another; this contrasts with many other European languages, which use inflection more extensively, meaning that a given word form can often be identified as belonging to a particular part of speech and having certain additional grammatical properties. In English, most words are uninflected, while the inflected endings that exist are mostly ambiguous: -ed may mark a verbal past tense, a participle or a fully adjectival form; -s may mark a plural noun, a possessive noun, or a present-tense verb form; -ing may mark a participle, gerund, or pure adjective or noun. Although -ly is a frequent adverb marker, some adverbs (e.g. tomorrow, fast, very) do not have that ending, while many adjectives do have it (e.g. friendly, ugly, lovely), as do occasional words in other parts of speech (e.g. jelly, fly, rely).

Many English words can belong to more than one part of speech. Words like neigh, break, outlaw, laser, microwave, and telephone might all be either verbs or nouns. In certain circumstances, even words with primarily grammatical functions can be used as verbs or nouns, as in, "We must look to the hows and not just the whys." The process whereby a word comes to be used as a different part of speech is called conversion or zero derivation.

== Functional classification ==
Linguists recognize that the above list of eight or nine word classes is drastically simplified. For example, "adverb" is to some extent a catch-all class that includes words with many different functions. Some have even argued that the most basic of category distinctions, that of nouns and verbs, is unfounded, or not applicable to certain languages. Modern linguists have proposed many different schemes whereby the words of English or other languages are placed into more specific categories and subcategories based on a more precise understanding of their grammatical functions.

Common lexical category set defined by function may include the following (not all of them will necessarily be applicable in a given language):

- Categories that will usually be open classes:
  - Adjectives
  - Adverbs
  - Nouns
  - Verbs (except auxiliary verbs)
  - Interjections
- Categories that will usually be closed classes:
  - Auxiliary verbs
  - Coverbs
  - Conjunctions
  - Determiners (Articles, quantifiers, demonstratives, and possessives)
  - Measure words or classifiers
  - Adpositions (prepositions, postpositions, and circumpositions)
  - Preverbs
  - Pronouns
  - Cardinal numerals
  - Particles

Within a given category, subgroups of words may be identified based on more precise grammatical properties. For example, verbs may be specified according to the number and type of objects or other complements which they take. This is called subcategorization.

Many modern descriptions of grammar include not only lexical categories or word classes, but also phrasal categories, used to classify phrases, in the sense of groups of words that form units having specific grammatical functions. Phrasal categories may include noun phrases (NP), verb phrases (VP) and so on. Lexical and phrasal categories together are called syntactic categories.

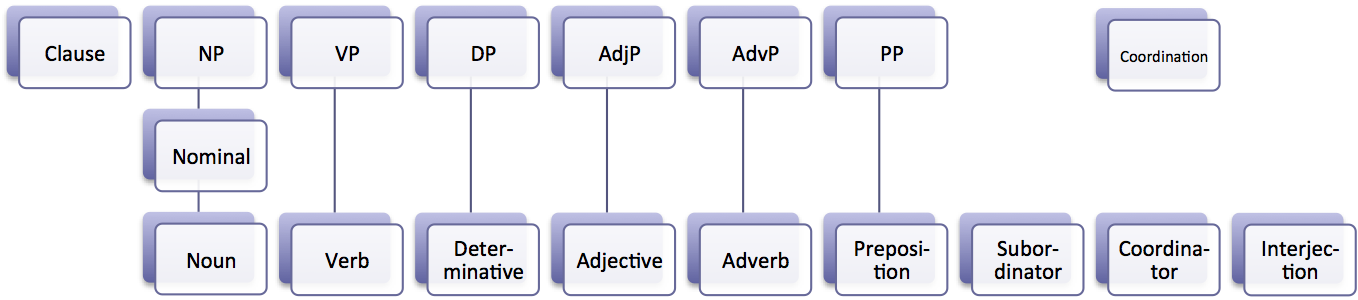
A diagram showing some of the posited English syntactic categories

== Open and closed classes ==
Word classes may be either open or closed. An open class is one that commonly accepts the addition of new words, while a closed class is one to which new items are very rarely added. Open classes normally contain large numbers of words, while closed classes are much smaller. Typical open classes found in English and many other languages are nouns, verbs (excluding auxiliary verbs, if these are regarded as a separate class), adjectives, adverbs and interjections. Ideophones are often an open class, though less familiar to English speakers, (Note: Ideophones do not always form a single grammatical word class, and their classification varies between languages, sometimes being split across other word classes. Rather, they are a phonosemantic word class, based on derivation, but may be considered part of the category of "expressives", which thus often form an open class due to the productivity of ideophones. Further, "[i]n the vast majority of cases, however, ideophones perform an adverbial function and are closely linked with verbs.") and are often open to nonce words. Typical closed classes are prepositions (or postpositions), determiners, conjunctions, and pronouns.

The open–closed distinction is related to the distinction between lexical and functional categories, and to that between content words and function words, and some authors consider these identical, but the connection is not strict. Open classes are generally lexical categories in the stricter sense, containing words with greater semantic content, while closed classes are normally functional categories, consisting of words that perform essentially grammatical functions. This is not universal: in many languages verbs and adjectives are closed classes, usually consisting of few members, and in Japanese the formation of new pronouns from existing nouns is relatively common, though to what extent these form a distinct word class is debated.

Words are added to open classes through such processes as compounding, derivation, coining, and borrowing. When a new word is added through some such process, it can subsequently be used grammatically in sentences in the same ways as other words in its class. A closed class may obtain new items through these same processes, but such changes are much rarer and take much more time. A closed class is normally seen as part of the core language and is not expected to change. In English, for example, new nouns, verbs, etc. are being added to the language constantly (including by the common process of verbing and other types of conversion, where an existing word comes to be used in a different part of speech). However, it is very unusual for a new pronoun, for example, to become accepted in the language, even in cases where it may be felt that there is a need for one, as in the case of gender-neutral pronouns.

The open or closed status of word classes varies between languages, even assuming that corresponding word classes exist. Most conspicuously, in many languages verbs and adjectives form closed classes of content words. An extreme example is found in Jingulu, which has only three verbs, while even the modern Indo-European Persian has no more than a few hundred simple verbs, a great deal of which are archaic. (Some twenty Persian verbs are used as light verbs to form compounds; this lack of lexical verbs is shared with other Iranian languages.) Japanese is similar, having few lexical verbs. Basque verbs are also a closed class, with the vast majority of verbal senses instead expressed periphrastically.

In Japanese, verbs and adjectives are closed classes, though these are quite large, with about 700 adjectives, and verbs have opened slightly in recent years. Japanese adjectives are closely related to verbs (they can predicate a sentence, for instance). New verbal meanings are nearly always expressed periphrastically by appending suru (する; to do) to a noun, as in undō suru (運動する; to (do) exercise), and new adjectival meanings are nearly always expressed by adjectival nouns, using the suffix -na (〜な) when an adjectival noun modifies a noun phrase, as in hen-na ojisan (変なおじさん; strange man). The closedness of verbs has weakened in recent years, and in a few cases new verbs are created by appending -ru (〜る) to a noun or using it to replace the end of a word. This is mostly in casual speech for borrowed words, with the most well-established example being sabo-ru (サボる; cut class; play hooky), from sabotāju (サボタージュ; sabotage). This recent innovation aside, the huge contribution of Sino-Japanese vocabulary was almost entirely borrowed as nouns (often verbal nouns or adjectival nouns). Other languages where adjectives are closed class include Swahili, Bemba, and Luganda.

By contrast, Japanese pronouns are an open class and nouns become used as pronouns with some frequency; a recent example is jibun (自分; self), now used by some as a first-person pronoun. The status of Japanese pronouns as a distinct class is disputed, however, with some considering it only a use of nouns, not a distinct class. The case is similar in languages of Southeast Asia, including Thai and Lao, in which, like Japanese, pronouns and terms of address vary significantly based on relative social standing and respect.

Some word classes are universally closed, however, including demonstratives and interrogative words.

== See also ==
- Part-of-speech tagging
- Sliding window based part-of-speech tagging
- Traditional grammar
