= Bǎ construction =

Chinese grammatical construction

The bǎ construction is a grammatical construction in the Chinese language. In a bǎ construction, the object of a verb is placed after the function word 把; bǎ (or, in more formal writing, 将; 將; jiāng), and the verb placed after the object, forming a subject–object–verb (SOV) sentence. Linguists commonly analyze bǎ as a light verb construction, or as a preposition.

== Formation ==
Charles Li and Sandra Thompson (1981) offer the following examples of the bǎ construction:

	[subject]	[bǎ]	[direct object]	[verb]
	你	把	他的意思	讲出来了
Transcription	nĭ	bǎ	tā-de yìsi	jiǎng-chū-lái le
Gloss	you	BA	he-POSSESSIVE meaning	speak-out-come CRS
Translation	You have explained what he meant. (Literally: "You have spoken out his meaning.")

	我	把	这三本书	都卖了
Transcription	wǒ	bǎ	zhè sān-běn shū	dōu mài-le
Gloss	I	BA	these three-CL book	all sell-PERFECTIVE
Translation	I sold all three books.

== Usage ==
The bǎ construction may only be used in certain contexts, generally those in which the verb expresses "settlement" of, or action upon, the object. According to Wang Li, "the disposal form states how a person is handled, manipulated, or dealt with; how something is disposed of; or how an affair is conducted," or, in other words, "what happens to" the object. Therefore, it is generally used with verbs that are high in transitivity, a property that describes the effect a verb has on its object; bǎ does not occur grammatically with verbs that express states or emotions, such as "love" and "miss", or with verbs that express activities that have no effect on the direct object, such as "sing" and "see".

The direct object of a bǎ construction must meet certain requirements as well. It is usually definite, meaning that it is specific and unique (as in phrases beginning with the equivalent of this, that, these, or those). It may sometimes also be generic, such as "salt" in the sentence "She sometimes eats salt thinking it's sugar." The object of a bǎ construction is nearly always something that both the speaker and hearer know about and are aware of.

== Research ==
Because of the numerous constraints on the kinds of words that may be used in bǎ construction, this construction has often been used in studies on language processing and on grammaticality judgments of native speakers. For example, sentences with bǎ construction that have syntactic violations (such as bǎ being followed by a verb rather than a noun) and semantic violations (such as bǎ being followed by a verb that doesn't express "disposal") have been used to study the interaction of syntactic and semantic processing in the brain using the neuroimaging technique of ERP, and to evaluate construction grammar's model of meaning-building.
