= Japanese adjectives =

Adjectives in Japanese

This article deals with Japanese equivalents of English adjectives.

== Types of adjective ==
In Japanese, nouns and verbs can modify nouns, with nouns taking the 〜の particles when functioning attributively (in the genitive case), and verbs in the attributive form. These are considered separate classes of words, however.

Most of the words that can be considered to be adjectives in Japanese fall into one of two categories – variants of verbs, and nouns:

- adjectival verb (Japanese: 形容詞, keiyōshi, literally 形容 "description" or "appearance" + 詞 "word"), or i-adjectives

These can be considered specialized verbs, in that they inflect for various aspects such as past tense or negation, and they can be used predicatively to end a sentence, without the need for any other "to be" verb. For example, atsui (暑い) "hot":

暑い日 (Atsui hi) ("a hot day")
今日は暑い。(Kyō wa atsui.) ("Today is hot.")

- adjectival noun (形容動詞, keiyō-dōshi, literally 形容 "description" or "appearance" + 動詞 "verb" (Note: In the traditional Japanese grammar, keiyō-dōshi, literally "adjective verb", includes the copula, while the adjectival noun in the analysis shown here does not include it. For example, in the traditional grammar, kirei da is a keiyō-dōshi and kirei is its stem; in the analysis here, kirei is an adjectival noun and kirei da is its combination with the copula. Considering the copula is a kind of verb and kirei is a kind of noun syntactically, both names make sense.)), or na-adjectives

These can be considered a form of noun in terms of syntax; these attach to the copula, which then inflects, but use 〜な (-na) (rather than the genitive 〜の) when modifying a noun. For example, hen (変) "strange":

変な人 (Hen-na hito) ("a strange person")
彼は変だ。(Kare wa hen da.) ("He is strange.")

Both the predicative forms (終止形 shūshikei, also called the "conclusive form" or "terminal form") and attributive forms (連体形 rentaikei) of i-adjectives and na-adjectives can be analyzed as verb phrases, making their attributive forms relative clauses rather than adjectives. According to this analysis, Japanese has no syntactic adjectives.

Japanese adjectives that do not fall into either of these categories are usually grouped into a grab-bag category:

- attributives (連体詞, rentaishi, literally 連 "connects, goes with" + 体 "body", short for 体言 "uninflecting word" such as a noun + 詞 "word")

These may only occur before nouns, and not in a predicative position. They are various in derivation and word class, and are generally analyzed as variants of more basic classes, where this specific form (possibly a fossil) can only be used in restricted settings. For example, ōkina (大きな) "big" (variant of 大きい):

大きな事 (Ōkina koto) ("a big thing")

A couple of small sub-categories can be distinguished in these categories, reflecting former grammatical distinctions or constructions which no longer exist:

- shii-adjectives (form of i-adjectives, see below)
- -yaka na adjectives (see below)
- -raka na adjectives (see below)
- taru-adjectives (ト・タル形容動詞, to, taru keiyōdōshi, literally "to, taru adjectival noun")

These are a variant of the common na-adjectives that developed in Late Old Japanese and have mostly died out, surviving in a few cases as fossils; they are usually classed as a form of 形容動詞 (na-adjective), as the Japanese name indicates.

- naru-adjectives

These are words that were traditionally earlier forms of na-adjectives, but that followed a path similar to taru-adjectives, surviving in a few cases as fossils. These are generally classed as attributives.

== Syntax ==
=== i-adjectives ===
i-adjectives end with い (i) (but never えい, ei) in base form. They may predicate sentences and inflect for past, negative, etc. As they head verb phrases, they can be considered a type of verbal (verb-like part of speech) and inflect in an identical manner as the negative form of verbs. Their inflections are different and not so numerous as full verbs.

i-adjectives are considered verbs because they inflect with the same bases as verbs and their respective usages: irrealis (未然形 mizenkei), continuative (連用形 renyōkei), terminal (終止形 shuushikei), attributive (連体形 rentaikei), hypothetical (仮定形 kateikei), and imperative (命令形 meireikei).

Among the six bases of verbs for i-adjectives, there exist two sets of inflection paradigms: a "plain" or "true" conjugation, and what is known as a kari-conjugation (カリ活用 kari-katsuyō), which is the result of the contraction between the "plain" continuative form 〜く (ku) and the verb あり (有り, 在り) ari, meaning "to exist", "to have", or "to be". Due to this, the kari-conjugation paradigm resembles that of the r-irregular conjugation paradigm (ラ行変格活用 ra-gyō henkaku katsuyō) of あり ari, however the hypothetical (historically the 已然形 izenkei) is 〜けれ kere instead of 〜かれ kare (used historically, and also the imperative base).

The stem of i-adjectives can combine (prepend on the left), similar to the continuative form of verbs, though this is less common than for verbs. Conversely, nouns or verb stems can sometimes prepend i-adjectives, or two i-adjectives can combine, forming compound modifiers; these are much less common than Japanese compound verbs. Common examples include omo-shiro-i (面白い; interesting) "face-whitening" (noun + i-adjective), and zuru-gashiko-i (狡賢い; sly) "crafty-clever" (i-adjective stem + i-adjective); while haya-tochiri (早とちり; going off half-cocked) "fast-fumble" (i-adjective stem + verb stem) shows an adjective stem joining to form a noun.

==== shii-adjectives ====
A number of i-adjectives end in -shii (〜しい) (sometimes written -sii). These are overwhelmingly words for feelings, like kanashii (悲しい; sad) or ureshii (嬉しい; happy). These were originally a separate class of adjectives, dating at least to Old Japanese (see Old Japanese adjectives), where the two classes are known as -ku (〜く) and -shiku (〜しく), corresponding to -i and -shii. However, they merged over the course of Late Middle Japanese (see Late Middle Japanese adjectives), and now shii-adjectives are simply a form of i-adjectives. The distinction, although no longer meaningful in pronunciation, is still reflected by the writing system, where し is still written out in hiragana, as in atarashii (新しい; new).

Adjectives that end in -jii (〜じい) are also considered -shii adjectives, such as susamajii (凄まじい; terrific), and historically onaji (同じ; same), which was initially a -shii adjective, and the classical negative volitional auxiliary maji (まじ).

=== na-adjectives ===
na-adjectives always occur with a form of the copula, traditionally considered part of the na-adjective itself. The only syntactical difference between nouns and na-adjective is in the attributive form, where nouns take の (no) and adjectives take な (na). This has led many linguists to consider them a type of nominal (noun-like part of speech). Through use of inflected forms of the copula, these words can also predicate sentences and inflect for past, negative, etc.

Notably, na-adjectives are distinct from regular nouns, in that they cannot be used as the topic, subject, or object. To function in these roles, the na-adjectives must include the nominalizing suffix さ (-sa), broadly similar to the English suffix -ness that is used to create nouns from adjectives.

==== -yaka na adjectives ====
There are a number of na-adjectives ending in 〜やか (-yaka), particularly for subjective words (compare i-adjectives ending in -shii). This is believed to be a combination of the two suffixes 〜や (-ya) and 〜か (-ka), where 〜や meant "softness" and 〜か meant "apparent, visible" (similar to modern 〜そう, -sō, which is also followed by 〜な), hence the combination 〜やか meant "appears somewhat ..., looks slightly ...". This was believed to have been used in the Nara era, and have become particularly popular in the Heian period, but is no longer productive. In some cases the original word is now only used (or almost always used) in the 〜やか form, such as 鮮やか (aza-yaka, "vivid, brilliant"), 穏やか (oda-yaka, "calm, gentle"), and 爽やか (sawa-yaka, "fresh, clear"), while in other cases the word is used in isolation, such as 雅 (miyabi, "elegant, graceful"), which is used alongside 雅やか (miyabi-yaka, "elegant, graceful"), and in other cases a related word also exists, such as 賑やか (nigi-yaka, "bustling, busy") and the verb 賑わう (nigi-wau, "be bustling, be busy"). The most basic of these is 賑やか (nigi-yaka, "bustling, busy"), but many of these are everyday words. Due to the 〜やか being originally a suffix, it is written as okurigana, even though the compound word may now be a fixed unit.

==== -raka na adjectives ====
Similarly, there are also a few na-adjectives ending in 〜らか (-raka), of similar origin. These are generally less subjective, but declined in popularity relative to the 〜やか construction in the Heian period Notable examples include 明らか (aki-raka, "clear, obvious") and 柔らか／軟らか (yawa-raka, "soft, gentle"). As with 〜やか words, the 〜らか is written out as okurigana.

==== taru-adjectives ====
A variant of na-adjectives exist, which take 〜たる (-taru) when functioning attributively (as an adjective, modifying a noun), and 〜と (-to) when functioning adverbially (when modifying a verb), instead of the 〜な (-na) and 〜に (-ni) which are mostly used with na-adjectives. taru-adjectives do not predicate a sentence (they cannot end a sentence, as verbs and i-adjectives can) or take the copula (as na-adjectives and nouns can), but must modify a noun or verb. Note that sometimes na-adjectives take a 〜と, and Japanese sound symbolisms generally take a (sometimes optional) 〜と, though these are different word classes.

There are very few of these words, and they usually are considered somewhat stiff or archaic; this word class is generally not covered in textbooks for foreign language learners of Japanese. One of the most common is 堂々 (dōdō, "magnificent, stately"). These are referred to in Japanese as ト・タル形容動詞 (to, taru keiyōdōshi) or タルト型活用 (taruto-kata katsuyō – “taru, to form conjugation”).

See 形容動詞#「タルト」型活用 for discussion in Japanese. Historically, these developed in Late Old Japanese as a variant of na-adjectives, but the form mostly died out; the remaining taru-adjectives are fossils, and conjugationally defective, having formerly held the pattern of the r-irregular class, like its component あり.

==== naru-adjectives ====
There are also a few naru-adjectives such as 単なる (tannaru, "mere, simple") or 聖なる (seinaru, "holy"), which developed similarly to taru-adjectives. As with taru-adjectives, these cannot predicate or take the copula, but must modify a noun (though generally not a verb – many of these only modify nouns via なる, not verbs via ×に), and often occur in set phrases, such as Mother Nature (母なる自然, haha-naru shizen). In Late Old Japanese, tari-adjectives developed as a variant of nari-adjectives. Most nari-adjectives became na-adjectives in Modern Japanese, while tari-adjectives either died out or survived as taru-adjective fossils, but a few nari adjectives followed a similar path to the tari-adjectives and became naru-adjective fossils. They are generally classed into attributives.

=== Attributives ===
Attributives are few in number, and unlike the other words, are strictly limited to modifying nouns. Attributives never predicate sentences. They derive from other word classes, and so are not always given the same treatment syntactically. For example, ano (あの, "that") can be analysed as a noun or pronoun あ (a) plus the genitive ending の (no); aru (ある or 或る, "a certain"), saru (さる, "a certain"), and iwayuru (いわゆる, "so-called") can be analysed as verbs (iwayuru being an obsolete passive form of the verb iu (言う) "to speak"); and ōkina (大きな, "big") can be analysed as the one remaining form of the obsolete adjectival noun ōki nari. Attributive onaji (同じ, "the same") is sometimes considered to be an attributive, but it is usually analysed as simply an irregular adjectival verb (note that it has an adverbial form onajiku). The final form onaji, which occurs with the copula, is usually considered to be a noun, albeit one derived from the adjectival verb.

It can be seen that attributives are analysed variously as nouns, verbs, or adjectival nouns.

=== Archaic forms ===
Various archaic forms from Middle Japanese remain as fossils, primarily uses of -shi (〜し) or -ki (〜き) forms that in Modern Japanese would usually be -i (〜い). Everyday examples notably include yoshi (良し; good, ok) and nashi (無し; nothing) – in modern grammar yoi (良い) and nai (無い), respectively. Similarly, furuki yoki (古き良き; good old (days etc.)) uses archaic forms of furui (古い; old) and yoi (良い; good).

== Inflection ==
=== i-adjective ===
i-adjectives have a basic inflection created by dropping the 〜い (-i) from the end and replacing it with the appropriate ending. i-adjectives are made more polite by the use of です (desu). です is added directly after the inflected plain form and has no syntactic function; its only purpose is to make the utterance more polite (see Honorific speech in Japanese).

	present	past	present neg.	past neg.
i-adjective	あつい (atsui)	あつかった (atsukatta)	あつくない (atsuku nai)	あつくなかった (atsuku nakatta)
polite i-adj.	あついです (atsui desu)	あつかったです (atsukatta desu)	あつくないです (atsuku nai desu) あつくありません (atsuku arimasen)	あつくなかったです (atsuku nakatta desu) あつくありませんでした (atsuku arimasen deshita)

いい (ii; "good") is a special case because it comes from the adjective 良い (yoi). In present tense, it is read as いい (ii), but since it derives from よい (yoi), all of its inflections supplete its forms instead. For example, 良いですね (ii desu ne; "[It] is good") becomes 良かったですね (yokatta desu ne; "[It] was good"). かっこいい (kakkoii; "cool") also fits the same category because it is a mash-up of 格好 (kakkō) and いい (ii).

い (i)-adjectives like 安い (yasui; "cheap") have the い (i) changed to ければ (kereba) to change them to conditional form, e.g., 安ければ (yasukereba); 安くなければ (yasukunakereba).

i-adjectives have a full verb inflection paradigm created through contraction with the former copular verb あり (ari), consisting of six verb bases, that obeys the grammar surrounding verbs in Japanese. The usage of the full inflection is more limited in Modern Japanese and the majority of adjective usage in Japanese will be within the bounds of the basic inflection above. Auxiliary verbs are attached to some of the verb bases in order to convey information; only the terminal, attributive, and imperative bases are used on their own without auxiliary support.

Irrealis (未然形)	Continuative (連用形)	Terminal (終止形)	Attributive (連体形)	Hypothetical (仮定形)	Imperative (命令形)
あつかろ (atsukaro) あつから (atsukara; (formal))	あつく (atsuku) あつかり (atsukari; (formal))	あつい (atsui) あつし (atsushi; (obsolete or formal))	あつい (atsui) あつき (atsuki; (formal))	あつけれ (atsukere)	あつかれ (atsukare)

The two irrealis stems, 〜かろ (karo) and 〜から (kara), are used for different purposes. The 〜かろ stem is used to create the volitional inflection by appending the volitional auxiliary 〜う (u), e.g. 暑かろう (atsukarō), while the 〜から stem is used for the formal negation auxiliary 〜ず (zu) and all other purposes which require the irrealis stem, e.g., 暑からず (atsukarazu).

The volitional form is generally used to convey supposition or presumption; there are also set phrases which utilize this form, a notable example being the volitional form of 良い (yoi), 良かろう (yokarō), a formal or archaic expression for "very well" or "it would be best to..." and the volitional form of 無い (nai), 無かろう (nakarō), a formal or archaic expression for "probably not so".

The imperative form is rarely used outside of set expressions; a common usage is once again with 良い (yoi), and its imperative form 良かれ (yokare), in idiomatic set expressions like 良かれと思う (yokare to omou; to wish for the best, to have good intentions) or 良かれ悪しかれ (yokare-ashikare; good or bad, for better or for worse, be it good or bad), also making use of the imperative form of 悪しい (ashii; (formerly the regular word for "bad", since replaced by 悪い (warui))). The imperative form of 無い (nai), 無かれ (nakare), is also used in archaic speech to indicate prohibition or a command not to do something or to indicate that one must not do something (also spelled 勿れ, 毋れ, 莫れ).

=== na-adjective ===
na-adjectives have a basic inflection created by dropping the 〜な (-na) and replacing it with the appropriate form of the verb だ (da), the copula. As with i-adjectives, na-adjectives are also made more polite by the use of です (desu). です is used in its role as the polite form of the copula, therefore replacing だ (the plain form of the copula) in the plain form of these adjectives.

	present	past	present neg.	past neg.
na-adjective	へんだ (hen da)	へんだった (hen datta)	へんではない (hen dewa (Note: The では (de wa) in the conjugation of the copula is often contracted in speech to じゃ (ja).) nai)	へんではなかった (hen dewa nakatta)
polite na-adj.	へんです (hen desu)	へんでした (hen deshita)	へんではありません (hen dewa arimasen)	へんではありませんでした (hen dewa arimasen deshita)

な (na)-adjectives have なら (nara) added to them to change to conditional form, and just like all other ない (nai) form inflections, behave like an い (i)-adjective when in negative form, e.g., 簡単じゃなければ (kantan ja nakereba).

Because na-adjectives are simply suffixed with the copula だ, they, too, like i-adjectives, have a full verb inflection paradigm with six bases that obeys the grammar surrounding Japanese verbs.

Irrealis (未然形)	Continuative (連用形)	Terminal (終止形)	Attributive (連体形)	Hypothetical (仮定形)	Imperative (命令形)
へんだろ (hen daro) へんでは (hen dewa) へんなら (hen nara; (formal or naru-adjective))	へんで (hen de) へんに (hen ni) へんなり (hen nari; (obsolete or formal or naru-adjective))	へんだ (hen da) へんなり (hen nari; (obsolete or formal or naru-adjective))	へんな (hen na) へんなる (hen naru; (formal or naru-adjective))	へんなら (hen nara) へんなれ (hen nare; (obsolete or naru-adjective))	へんであれ (hen de are) へんなれ (hen nare; (formal or naru-adjective))

Similarly to i-adjectives, out of the multiple irrealis stems, the 〜だろ (daro) irrealis stem is only used with the volitional auxiliary suffix 〜う (u), to form the volitional form suffixed with volitional copula 〜だろう (darō), used primarily to present a supposition or presumption. The 〜では (dewa) irrealis stem is not considered a true irrealis stem because it is simply the continuative stem plus the case particle は (wa), but is nevertheless suffixied with standard negation auxiliary 〜ない (nai) to form the negative form (see the basic inflection above). The 〜なら (nara) irrealis stem is used with the formal negation auxiliary 〜ず (zu) and all other uses of the irrealis stem.

The 〜なる (naru) attributive form exists as a fossil from the archaic ナリ活用 (nari katsuyō), or nari-conjugation, the precursor to the modern na-adjective. Generally only the 〜な (na) form is used for attribution, but the 〜なる (naru) form may be used to add a sense of stress, intensity, profundity, formality, or an imitation of archaic speech, such as 人類の偉大なる遺産 (jinrui no idai-naru isan; "the great legacy of humanity"), as compared to 人類の偉大な遺産 (jinrui no idai-na isan). It may also be seen in set phrases, like in 親愛なる (shin'ai-naru), used to open and address a letter to someone, much like English dear.

The 〜なる (naru) attributive form is also used in naru-adjectives, like 単なる (tan-naru) or 聖なる (sei-naru). In almost all cases, these are used exclusively as pre-noun attributives and cannot be used in any of the other standard forms of na-adjectives. In Modern Japanese, they only serve to modify nouns and cannot be used terminally nor even adverbially, as a contrast with the similar taru-adjectives. It is generally considered ungrammatical or unnatural to use other forms with naru-adjectives, even if technically syntactically correct.

=== taru-adjective ===
taru-adjectives have much more limited usage in Modern Japanese and generally can only be used attributively with 〜たる (taru) or adverbially with 〜と (to). Generally, to express past or negative forms, additional other words or syntax are added to the sentence rather than using the full verb paradigm. However, nevertheless, taru-adjectives do have a full verb paradigm with six bases that obeys the grammar surrounding verbs in Japanese, which may be used in archaic or highly formal speech.

Irrealis (未然形)	Continuative (連用形)	Terminal (終止形)	Attributive (連体形)	Hypothetical (仮定形)	Imperative (命令形)
どうどうたろ (dōdō taro) どうどうたら (dōdō tara)	どうどうと (dōdō to) どうどうたり (dōdō tari)	どうどうたり (dōdō tari; (obsolete))	どうどうたる (dōdō taru)	どうどうたれ (dōdō tare)	どうどうたれ (dōdō tare)

The terminal form 〜たり (tari) is almost never used. Generic words like 物 (mono), 事 (koto), 人 (hito), and 方 (kata) are used as fill-ins with the attributive form instead.

=== Adverb forms ===
Both i-adjectives and na-adjectives can form adverbs. In the case of i-adjectives, い (i) changes to く (ku):

熱くなる (atsuku naru; "become hot")

and in the case of na-adjectives, な (na) changes to に (ni):

変になる (hen ni naru; "become strange")

There are also some words like たくさん (takusan) and 全然 (zenzen) that are adverbs in their root form:

全然分かりません (zenzen wakarimasen; "[I] absolutely not understand.")

	adverb
i-adjective	はやく (hayaku; "quickly")
na-adjective	しずかに (shizuka ni; "quietly")
taru-adjective	ゆうぜんと (yuuzen to; "calmly")

In a few cases, a 〜に (ni) form of a word is common while a 〜な (na) form is rare or non-existent, as in 誠に (makoto-ni; "sincerely") – 誠 (makoto; "sincerity") is common, but ×誠な (*makoto-na; "sincere") is generally not used.

== Terminology ==
This page	Japanese (kanji)	Japanese (rōmaji)	Other names
adjectival verbs	形容詞	keiyōshi	adjectival verbs, i-adjectives, adjectives, stative verbs
adjectival nouns	形容動詞	keiyōdōshi	adjectival nouns, na-adjectives, copular nouns, quasi-adjectives, nominal adjectives, adjectival verbs
attributives	連体詞	rentaishi	attributives, true adjectives, prenominals, pre-noun adjectivals

The Japanese word keiyōshi is used to denote an English adjective.

Because the widespread study of Japanese is still relatively new in the Western world, there are no generally accepted English translations for the above parts of speech, with varying texts adopting different sets, and others extant not listed above.

The current terms as accepted in schools (see w:ja:学校文法) for adjectival words are keiyōshi (形容詞) and keiyō dōshi (形容動詞). Here, keiyō (形容; lit. 'form' or 'figure' or 'appearance' or 'description') refers to the semantic aspect of these words as qualifying the state or condition of a "noun;" and dōshi (動詞; lit. 'moving/acting/working word'), etymologically and historically, refers to (1) conjugative words in general ("i-adjectives," "na-adjectives," "verbs" and "auxiliary verbs"), (2) conjugative words with ichidan, nidan, yodan, godan and irregular conjugation ("verbs" and "auxiliary verbs"), or (3) conjugative words that semantically convey action ("verbs").

Historically, most grammarians used keiyōshi the same way it is used today in schools, as a specific type of word that qualifies "nouns" and that corresponds to what is known to foreign learners today as "i-adjectives" (see Japanese grammar § Different classifications for detail). However, a few, under the influence of European grammatical traditions, deviated from this norm and considered these so-called "adjectives" a subclass of dōshi. The grammarian Matsushita Daizaburō used the term keiyō dōshi (形容動詞; lit. 'stative working-word') for "i-adjectives," (Note: in contrast with dōsa dōshi (動作動詞; lit. 'action working-word') for "verbs") and reserved keiyōshi, as well as its English translation adjective, specifically for any non-conjugative words that can be placed in front of a "noun," which correspond to attributive adjectives in English (he later switched to fukutaishi (副體詞) to avoid confusion). Ōtsuki Fumihiko, while still following the mainstream terminology in his own grammar, expressed his opinion that Japanese "adjectives," due to their affinity with "verbs," are not at all like adjectives in English, Latin, French, German, etc., and suggested keiyō dōshi as an alternative term like Matsushita. The "attributive adjective" sense was applied in a different way by yet other grammarians, such as Hamada Kenjirō and Ōwada Takeki, who used keiyō dōshi for "verb" forms that occur attributively. In sum:

- Most grammarians used keiyōshi for such words as shiroshi (shiroi) (白し（白い）) as in inu-wa shiroshi (inu-wa shiroi) (犬は白し（犬は白い）; lit. 'as for the dog, it is white') and shiroki (shiroi) (白き（白い）) as in shiroki inu (shiroi inu) (白き犬（白い犬）; lit. 'white dog'). In this case, keiyōshi means "qualifying i-adjectives."
- A few used keiyō dōshi for such words as shiroshi (shiroi) (白し（白い）) as in inu-wa shiroshi (inu-wa shiroi) (犬は白し（犬は白い）; lit. 'as for the dog, it is white'), while reserving keiyōshi for such words as ko-no (この) as in ko-no inu (この犬; lit. 'this dog'). In this case, keiyō dōshi means "qualifying i-adjectives," and keiyōshi means "non-conjugative words that precede nouns."
- Another few used keiyōshi for such words as shiroki (shiroi) (白き（白い）) as in shiroki inu (shiroi inu) (白き犬（白い犬）; lit. 'white dog'), and keiyō dōshi for such words as hashiru (走る) as in hashiru inu (走る犬; lit. 'running dog'). In this case, keiyōshi means "words that precede nouns," and keiyō dōshi means "conjugative words that precede nouns and have ichidan, nidan, yodan, godan or irregular conjugation."

The first use of keiyō dōshi for "na-adjectives" is attributed to Haga Yaichi. In this case, keiyō has the same "qualifying" meaning as in keiyōshi ("qualifying i-adjectives"), while dōshi is specifically for the irregular conjugation of the auxiliary copula ari (あり), which, when fused with the particles -ni (に) and -to (と), results in -nari (なり) and -tari (たり), both of which correspond to the modern -da (だ); in other words, keiyō dōshi means "qualifying conjugative words with irregular conjugation." Haga also included the -kari (かり) ending resulting from a fusion of the -ku (く) form of keiyōshi. In sum, according to Haga:

- Keiyō dōshi is used for such words as shizuka-nari (静かなり) as in inu-wa shizuka-nari (犬は静かなり; lit. 'as for the dog, it is quiet'), shizuka-naru (静かなり) as in shizuka-naru inu (静かなる犬; lit. 'quiet dog'), heizen-tari (平然たり) as in heizen-tari inu (犬は平然たり; lit. 'as for the dog, it is calm'), heizen-taru (平然たる) as in heizen-taru inu (平然たる犬; lit. 'calm dog'), and shirokari (白かり) as in inu-wa shirokarita (犬は白かりた; lit. 'as for the dog, it was white').

While Haga used keiyō dōshi to describe classical Japanese (文語, bungo; lit. 'written language'), Yoshioka Kyōsuke similarly used it to describe modern Japanese (口語, kōgo; lit. 'spoken language'). According to him:

- Keiyō dōshi is used for such words as shizuka-da/-desu (静かだ／です) as in inu-wa shizuka-da/-desu (犬は静かだ／です; lit. 'as for the dog, it is quiet'), shizuka-na (静かな) as in shizuka-na inu (静かな犬; lit. 'quiet dog'), and shirokat (白かっ) as in inu-wa shirokatta (犬は白かった; lit. 'as for the dog, it was white').

Yoshioka did not consider shizuka-da/-desu and shizuka-na as different forms of the same word, but different words, despite the fact that in his analysis, shizuka-da/-desu lacks an attributive form (there is no *shizuka-de inu (静かで犬)), while shizuka-na lacks a terminal form (there is no *inu-wa shizuka-naru (犬は静なる)).

On the other hand, Hashimoto Shinkichi considered the -kari as merely a keiyōshi ending, separate from -nari and -tari as keiyō dōshi endings. Hashimoto's classification was firmly solidified by Iwabuchi Etsutarō's grammar entitled Chūtō Bunpō (中等文法) (1943), the basis for modern school grammar, as well as for the distinction between "i-adjectives" and "na-adjectives" taught to foreign learners. It also popularized rentaishi (連体詞) for "non-conjugative attributive words." In sum, currently:

- Keiyōshi is used for such words as shiroi (白い) as in inu-wa shiroi (犬は白い; lit. 'as for the dog, it is white') and shiroi (白い) as in shiroi inu (白い犬; lit. 'white dog').
- Keiyō dōshi is used for such words as chūjitsu-da (忠実だ) as in inu-wa chūjitsu-da (犬は忠実だ; lit. 'as for the dog, it is loyal') and chūjitsu-na (忠実な) as in chūjitsu-na inu (忠実な犬; lit. 'loyal dog').
- Rentaishi is used for such words as ko-no (この) as in ko-no inu (この犬; lit. 'this dog').

Note that some so-called "naru-adjectives" and all "taru-adjectives" were keiyō dōshi in classical Japanese where they were conjugative (inu-wa sei-nari (犬は聖なり; lit. 'as for the dog, it is holy'), sei-naru inu (聖なる犬; lit. 'holy dog'); inu-wa heizen-tari (犬は平然たり; lit. 'as for the dog, it is calm'), heizen-taru inu (平然たる犬; lit. 'calm dog')), but they are rentaishi in modern Japanese where only their attributive forms survived (sei-naru inu (聖なる犬; lit. 'holy dog'); heizen-taru inu (平然たる犬; lit. 'calm dog')). Furthermore, a few apparent "na-adjectives" can only occur attributively (ōki-na inu (大きな犬; lit. 'large dog'), chiisa-na inu (小さな犬; lit. 'small dog')) and therefore are classified as rentaishi instead.

For other historical terms for these classes of words, see the table at Japanese grammar § Different classifications.

== See also ==
- Japanese verb conjugation
- Japanese godan and ichidan verbs
- Japanese grammar
