= Adjectival noun (Japanese) =

Japanese noun type

In descriptions of the Japanese language, an adjectival noun, nominal adjective, copular noun, adjectival verb (形容動詞, keiyō dōshi), quasi-adjective, pseudo-adjective, or na-adjective, is a noun that can function as an adjective by taking the particle 〜な -na. (In comparison, regular nouns can function adjectivally by taking the particle 〜の -no, which is analyzed as the genitive case.) Adjectival nouns constitute one of several Japanese word classes that can be considered equivalent to adjectives.

In their attributive function, Japanese adjectival nouns function similarly to English noun adjuncts, as in "chicken soup" or "winter coat" – in these cases, the nouns "chicken" and "winter" modify the nouns "soup" and "coat", respectively. Japanese adjectival nouns can also be used predicatively – in that use, they do not take the -na suffix, but normally combine with forms of the copular verb.

== Terminology ==
The current term for the so-called "adjectival nouns" is keiyō dōshi (形容動詞). Here, keiyō (形容; lit. 'form' or 'figure' or 'appearance' or 'description') refers to the semantic aspect of these words as qualifying the state or condition of a noun (名詞, meishi); and dōshi (動詞; lit. 'moving/acting/working word'), etymologically and historically, refers to (1) conjugative words in general ("i-adjectives," "na-adjectives," "verbs" and "auxiliary verbs"), (2) conjugative words with ichidan, nidan, yodan, godan and irregular conjugation ("verbs" and "auxiliary verbs"), or (3) conjugative words that semantically convey action ("verbs"). Historically, this term was used tentatively by some grammarians, such as Matsushita Daizaburō, for words that are now called keiyōshi (形容詞; lit. 'stative working-word') (Note: in contrast with dōsa dōshi/sayō dōshi (動作動詞／作用動詞; lit. 'action working-word') for "verbs.") Ōtsuki Fumihiko, while still following the mainstream terminology in his own grammar, expressed his opinion that Japanese "adjectives," due to their affinity with "verbs," are not at all like adjectives in English, Latin, French, German, etc., and suggested keiyō dōshi as an alternative term like Matsushita. The "attributive adjective" sense was applied in a different way by yet other grammarians, such as Hamada Kenjirō and Ōwada Takeki, who used keiyō dōshi for "verb" forms that occur attributively, such as hashiru (走る; lit. 'run') as in hashiru inu (走る犬; lit. 'running dog'). The first use of keiyō dōshi for so-called "na-adjectives" is attributed to Haga Yaichi. In this case, keiyō has the same "qualifying" meaning as in keiyōshi ("qualifying i-adjectives"), while dōshi is specifically for the irregular conjugation of the auxiliary copula ari (あり), which, when fused with the particles -ni (に) and -to (と), results in -nari (なり) and -tari (たり), both of which correspond to the modern -da (だ); in other words, keiyō dōshi means "qualifying conjugative words with irregular conjugation." Haga also included the -kari (かり) ending resulting from a fusion of the -ku (く) form of keiyōshi.

The Japanese term is not necessarily at odds with the English term adjectival noun, since in traditional Japanese grammar, keiyō dōshi includes the copula, while the adjectival noun in the analysis described here does not include the copula. For example, in the traditional grammar, kirei da is a keiyō dōshi and kirei is its stem; in the analysis here, kirei is an adjectival noun and kirei da is its combination with the copula. Considering the copula is a kind of verb and kirei is a kind of noun syntactically, both terminologies make sense.

Grammatically, these words are similar to nouns, or more technically, nominals, which function attributively (like adjectives). The main differences between these and regular nouns are that nouns take a 〜の -no suffix when acting attributively, while these words take a 〜な -na suffix when acting attributively; most of these words cannot be used as the agent or patient (i.e. subject) of a sentence; and most of these words cannot be modified by relative clauses. Aside from these differences, Japanese adjectival nouns and regular nouns behave the same way in terms of grammar. They are variously referred to as "adjectival verbs" (literal translation), "adjectival nouns" (nouns that function adjectivally), "na adjectives" (function as adjectives, take na), and "na nominals" (nominals that take na). For example, Eleanor Harz Jorden refers to them as "na-nominals" in her textbook Japanese: The Spoken Language.

In fact, by some analyses, nouns and na-nominals are fundamentally grammatically the same, where 〜の vs. 〜な when used attributively is simply a conventional stylistic complementary distribution, with 〜の／〜な being allomorphs. This view is reinforced by the fact that some words, such as 特別 tokubetsu "special", can take either a 〜の or a 〜な, depending on the phrase. Ultimately, 〜な is an abbreviation of 〜にある, used to use a noun attributively (compare modern 〜である, which is a more recent form), while 〜の is the genitive case; see etymology, below.

== Characterization ==
In traditional Japanese grammar, adjectival nouns are considered "inflectional", katsuyō, like verbs and i-adjectives, rather than non-inflectional hikatsuyōgo (非活用語) or mukatsuyōgo (無活用語), like nouns.

This is a point of disagreement in current Japanese grammar, and authors such as Uehara (1998) argue that instead, adjectival nouns should be classed with nouns as non-inflectional.

The claim that na-adjectives are inflectional rests on the claim that the syllable da 'is', usually regarded as a "copula verb", is really a suffix – an inflection. Thus, hon 'book', generates a one-word sentence, honda 'it is a book', not a two-word sentence, hon da. However, numerous constructions seem to be incompatible with the suffixal copula claim.

1. Reduplication for emphasis
  Hora! Hon, hon! 'See, it is a book!'
  Hora! Kirei, kirei! 'See, it is pretty!'
  Hora! Furui, furui! 'See, it is old!' (the adjectival inflection -i cannot be left off)
  Hora! Iku, iku! 'See, it does go!' (the verbal inflection -u cannot be left off)
2. Questions. In Japanese, questions are formed by adding the particle ka (or in colloquial speech, just by changing the intonation of the sentence).
  Hon/kirei ka? 'Is it a book?; Is it pretty?'
  Furu-i/Ik-u ka? 'Is it old?; Does it go?' (the inflections cannot be left off)
3. Several auxiliary verbs, e.g., mitai, 'looks like it's'
  Hon mitai da; Kirei mitai da 'It seems to be a book; It seems to be pretty'
  Furu-i mitai da; Ik-u mitai da 'It seems to be old; It seems to go'

On the basis of such constructions, Uehara (1998) finds that the copula is indeed an independent word, and that regarding the parameters on which i-adjectives share the syntactic pattern of verbs, the nominal adjectives pattern with pure nouns instead.

== taru adjectives ==
In Late Old Japanese (below), a separate kind of tari adjectival nouns developed alongside the existing nari ones (nari, tari were the conclusive forms, while naru, taru were the attributive forms). The nari ones developed into the adjectival nouns (naru contracted to na, while nari was replaced by da (the copula)) that are the subject of this article, while the tari ones mostly died out over the course of Late Middle Japanese, being mostly gone by Early Modern Japanese, surviving as fossils in a few words which are generally considered somewhat stiff or archaic. These are generally referred to as ト・タル形容動詞 (to, taru keiyōdōshi) or タルト型活用 (taruto-kata katsuyō – “taru, to form conjugation”), and can also function adverbially with 〜と -to, instead of the 〜に -ni which is mostly used with な nominals. See taru adjectives for further discussion in English, and 形容動詞#タルト型活用 for Japanese.

=== naru adjectives ===
A few nari adjectival nouns followed a similar path to tari adjectival nouns, becoming naru adjectives in Modern Japanese (analogous to taru adjectives), rather than na adjectives as most nari adjectival nouns did. These include 単なる tannaru "mere, simple" or 聖なる seinaru "holy" and are generally classed as rentaishi.

== Historical forms ==
=== Old Japanese ===
Old Japanese has one type of adjectival noun with the following inflections.

Irrealis 未然形	Adverbial 連用形	Conclusive 終止形	Attributive 連体形	Realis 已然形	Imperative 命令形
-nara	-nari	-nari	-naru	-nare	-nare

=== Late Old Japanese ===
Late Old Japanese has two types of adjectival nouns: nar- and tar-.

Type	Irrealis 未然形	Adverbial 連用形	Conclusive 終止形	Attributive 連体形	Realis 已然形	Imperative 命令形
Nar-	-nara	-nari -ni	-nari	-naru	-nare	-nare
Tar-	-tara	-tari -to	-tari	-taru	-tare	-tare

The newly developed tar- inflections are used in kanbun kundoku (reading a Chinese text in Japanese).

=== Early Middle Japanese ===
Early Middle Japanese has two types of adjectival nouns: na- and tar-.

Type	Irrealis 未然形	Adverbial 連用形	Conclusive 終止形	Attributive 連体形	Realis 已然形	Imperative 命令形
Na-	-nara	-nari -ni	-nari	-naru -na	-nare	
Tar-		-to	-tari	-taru		

=== Late Middle Japanese ===
Late Middle Japanese has two types of adjectival nouns: na and t-.

Type	Irrealis 未然形	Adverbial 連用形	Conclusive 終止形	Attributive 連体形	Realis 已然形	Imperative 命令形
N-	-nara	-ni -de	-dya -na	-naru -na no	-nare	
T-		-to		-taru		

=== Early Modern Japanese (Kamigata) ===
The early half of Early Modern Japanese as exhibited in the Kamigata region has a single type of adjectival noun with the following inflections.

Irrealis 未然形	Adverbial 連用形	Conclusive 終止形	Attributive 連体形	Realis 已然形	Imperative 命令形
	-ni -de	-na	-na	-nare	

The deteriorating tar- type is lost.

=== Early Modern Japanese (Edo) ===
The later half of Early Modern Japanese as found in Edo has a single type of adjectival noun with the following inflections. These forms are identical to the modern forms.

Irrealis 未然形	Adverbial 連用形	Conclusive 終止形	Attributive 連体形	Hypothetical 仮定形	Imperative 命令形
-daro	-daQ -de -ni	-da	-na	-nara	

== Modern Japanese ==
There is one type of adjectival noun in modern usage, with inflections as follows.

Irrealis 未然形	Adverbial 連用形	Conclusive 終止形	Attributive 連体形	Hypothetical 仮定形	Imperative 命令形
-daro	-daQ -de -ni	-da	-na	-nara	

- The modern inflections are based on two primitive forms: d- and n-. The n- forms are historically older while the d- forms are newer and have replaced some of the older n- forms.
- Irrealis -daro is found with particle -u, resulting in -darou (-darō). Historically it was -dara. /au/ regularly changed into [ō].
- Adverbial -daQ is often found with past particle -ta, resulting in "daQta" -> "datta".
- Adverbial -de is found before "aru" and "nai", as well as being used in to terminate one clause before beginning another (中止法).
- Adverbial -ni is used in adverbial constructions.
- Modern Japanese no longer inflects for imperative.

== Etymology ==
Japanese adjectival nouns differ in etymological origin from adjectival verbs. Whereas adjectival verbs are almost entirely native in origin, the class of adjectival nouns comprises mostly foreign loanwords and a small subset of polymorphemic native words. All words listed in this section take the attributive -na and predicative -da copula.

=== Loanwords ===
Most adjectival nouns are of primarily Chinese origin, but there is a not-insignificant quantity of adjectival noun loanwords from other languages as well (most notably English.)

Chinese Origin (Sino-Japanese vocabulary)

Word	Romanization	Gloss
豊富	hōfu	bounty, ampleness / bounteous, ample
元気	genki	spirit, liveliness / energetic, lively
安全	anzen	safe / safety

English Origin (gairaigo)

Word	Romanization	Gloss
リアル	riaru	(the) real world/real
モダン	modan	modernity / modern
スリリング	suriringu	thrill / thrilling

French Origin

Word	Romanization	Gloss (French)	Gloss (English)
アバンギャルド	abangyarudo	avant-garde	avant-garde
シュール	shuuru	surréalistique	surreal / surrealism
シック	shikku	chic	chic / in vogue

=== Native Words ===
In addition to loanwords, within the class of adjectival nouns also exists a small subset of native Japanese words (wago). These words are argued to be polymorphemic in nature, with the latter -ka, -raka, -yaka being a suffix that creates an adjectival noun. Nishiyama (1999) asserts that this helps to distinguish native adjectival nouns from native adjectival verbs.

Native Adjectival Nouns

Word	Romanization	Gloss
静-か	shizu-ka	silent; quiet
爽-やか	sawa-yaka	fresh
明-らか	aki-raka	obvious; clear; plain

=== Copula -na/-da ===
All forms of the copula (the vehicle for the inflection of adjectival nouns) can be considered to derive from two infinitive forms, ni and to. Because the copula lacked any other forms, secondary conjugations with the verb ari were used. The original ni ari and to ari contracted to form nari and tari. To derive the modern forms na and da, changes such as the following have been proposed.

For attributive na (rentaikei):

- ni aru > naru > na

For predicative da (shūshikei):

- ni te ari > de ari > de a > da

In some regions, these changes progressed differently, resulting in forms such as ja (Chūgoku, Shikoku, or Kyūshū; particularly common in Hiroshima) or ya (associated with Kansai dialect, particularly Ōsaka.)

The infinitive form ni is still in widespread use (e.g. hen ni naru, "become strange"), but the form to has become a much rarer alternative for use with adjectives.

== Internal properties ==
The internal properties of Japanese adjectival nouns can be analysed either through a lexical features approach or through a Distributed Morphology approach.

=== Chomsky's lexical properties ===
Miyagawa argues that Japanese adjectival nouns can be classified using Noam Chomsky's lexical feature system. He proposed the following analysis for Japanese lexical categories:

Japanese Lexical Categories

Lexical Category	Lexical Features
Verb	[+V, -N]
Noun	[-V, +N]
Verbal Noun	[-V, +N]
Adjectival Verb	[+V]
Adjectival Noun	[+V, +N]
Postposition	[-V, -N]

Under this system, Japanese adjectival nouns are classed similarly to English pure adjectives [+V, +N]. However, because Japanese also has adjectival verbs with the lexical property [+V], it is observed that Japanese adjectival nouns and English pure adjectives are distinct.

=== Morphological tree structure ===
The internal morphological structure of Japanese adjectival phrases can be represented by the following trees:

Adjectival Noun	Adjectival Verb	Noun

Within the tree structures, the word root combines with the functional category n0 to become a noun, then combine with the functional head a0 to form an adjective. Both nouns and adjectives contain the root-n0 combination, and it is the presence of a0 that results in the appearance of the attributive copula -na.

== See also ==
- Japanese adjectives
- Japanese grammar
- Japanese verb conjugation
