= Light verb =

Grammatical component

In linguistics, a light verb is a verb that has little semantic content of its own and forms a predicate with some additional expression, which is usually a noun. Common verbs in English that can function as light verbs are do, give, have, make, get, and take. Other names for light verb include delexical verb, vector verb, explicator verb, thin verb, empty verb and semantically weak verb. While light verbs are similar to auxiliary verbs regarding their contribution of meaning to the clauses in which they appear, light verbs fail the diagnostics that identify auxiliary verbs and are therefore distinct from auxiliaries.

The intuition between the term "light verb" is that the predicate is not at its full semantic potential. For instance, one does not literally "take" a bath in the same way as one can "take" a cup of sugar. At the same time, light verbs are not completely empty semantically, because there is a clear difference in meaning between "take a bath" and "give a bath", and one cannot "do a bath".

Light verbs can be accounted for in different ways in theoretical frameworks, for example as semantically empty predicate licensers or a kind of auxiliary. In dependency grammar approaches they can be analyzed using the concept of the catena.

== Examples ==
=== English ===
Most light verb constructions in English include a noun and are sometimes called stretched verbs. Some light verb constructions also include a preposition, e.g.

They did the review of my paper first.
Sam did the cleaning yesterday.

Who got such intense criticism?
Susan is getting much support from her family.

I am going to have a nice nap.
She had a smoke.
We had a slow, boring conversation.

Are you giving a presentation at the conference?
They gave the kids a hard time.
Who will give you a hug?

Who made such a severe mistake?
I made the first request.

Sam has taken a shower.
Why is Larry taking a nap?
We should take a break soon.
Have you taken advantage of that opportunity?
I haven't taken that into consideration.

The light verbs are underlined, and the words in bold together constitute the light verb constructions. Each of these constructions is the (primary part of the) main predicate of the sentence. Note that the determiner a is usually NOT part of the light verb construction. We know that it is not part of the light verb construction because it is variable, e.g. I took a long/the first/two/the best nap. The light verb contributes little content to its sentence; the main meaning resides with the noun in bold.

=== Hindi-Urdu ===
Light verb constructions in Hindi–Urdu (Hindustani) are highly productive. Light verbs in Hindi–Urdu can combine with another verb, an adjective, adverb or even a borrowed English verb or noun. The light verb loses its own independent meaning and instead "lends a certain shade of meaning" to the main or stem verb, which "comprises the lexical core of the compound". While any verb can act as a main verb, there is a limited set of productive light verbs. Some commonly used light verbs are shown in the table belowː

Light Verb	Explanation	Example		
Light Verb	Explanation	verb	verb root + light verb	Translation
जाना (jānā) — to go	gives a sense of perfective aspect (completed action), finality, or change of state	आना (ānā) — to come	आ जाना (ā jānā)	to come (shows finished action)
लेना (lēnā) — to take	suggests that the action is completed and the benefit of the action flows towards the doer.	करना (karnā) — to do	कर लेना (kar lenā)	to do (for one's own benefit)
देना (denā) — to give	suggests that the action was completed and the benefit of the action flows away from the doer.	करना (karnā) — to do	कर देना (kar denā)	to do (not for one's own benefit)
आना (ānā) — to come	gives a sense of perfective aspect (completed action) but also the doer returns after doing the action	करना (karnā) — to do	कर आना (kar ānā)	to do (and return)
डालना (ḍalnā) — to pour, insert	indicates an action is done vigorously, decisively, violently, or recklessly.	करना (karnā) — to do	कर डालना (kar ḍālnā)	to do (vigorously; at once)
बैठना (baiṭhnā) — to sit	implies an action done foolishly or stubbornly	करना (karnā) — to do	कर बैठना (kar baiṭhnā)	to do (by mistake, without thinking twice)
सकना (saknā) — to be able to	indicates the capability of performing an action.	करना (karnā) — to do	कर सकना (kar saknā)	to do (to have the ability to do)
रखना (rakhnā) — to keep	implies a firmness of action, or one with possibly long-lasting results or implications;	करना (karnā) — to do	कर रखना (kar rakhnā)	to have done
चुकना (cuknā) — to have completed	shows sense of completeness of an action in the past that was already finished by the doer in the past.	करना (karnā) — to do	कर चुकना (kar cuknā)	to have already done
उठना (uṭhnā) — to get up	functions like an intensifier; suggests inception of action or feeling.	बोलना (bolnā) — to speak	बोल उठना (bol uṭhnā)	to speak (to burst into speaking)
पड़ना (par̥nā) — to fall flat	connotes involuntary, sudden, or unavoidable occurrence	गिरना (girnā) — to fall	गिर पड़ना (gir par̥nā)	to fall (by mistake)
Light Verb	Explanation	noun/adjective/adverb	noun/adjective/adverb + light verb	translation
होना (honā) — to be, to exist	converts nouns, adjectives, and adverbs into intransitive verbs	साफ़ (sāf) — clean	साफ़ होना (sāf honā)	to be clean; to clean oneself
होना (honā) — to be, to exist	converts nouns, adjectives, and adverbs into intransitive verbs	apply	apply होना (apply honā)	to apply; to be applied
होना (honā) — to be, to exist	converts nouns, adjectives, and adverbs into intransitive verbs	beautiful	beautiful होना (beautiful honā)	to be beautiful
होना (honā) — to be, to exist	converts nouns, adjectives, and adverbs into intransitive verbs	जल्दी से (jaldī se) — quickly	जल्दी से होना (jaldī se honā)	to happen quickly
करना (karnā) — to do, to make	converts nouns, adjectives, and adverbs into transitive verbs	साफ़ (sāf) — clean	साफ़ करना (sāf karnā)	to clean
करना (karnā) — to do, to make	converts nouns, adjectives, and adverbs into transitive verbs	apply	apply करना (apply karnā)	to apply
करना (karnā) — to do, to make	converts nouns, adjectives, and adverbs into transitive verbs	beautiful	beautiful करना (beautiful karnā)	to make beautiful; to beautify
करना (karnā) — to do, to make	converts nouns, adjectives, and adverbs into transitive verbs	जल्दी से (jaldī se) — quickly	जल्दी से करना (jaldī se karnā)	to do quickly

== Alternative constructions with full verbs ==
Many light verb constructions are closely similar in meaning to a corresponding full verb, e.g.

a. Sam did a revision of his paper. – Light verb construction
b. Sam revised his paper. -Full verb

a. Larry wants to have a smoke. – Light verb construction
b. Larry wants to smoke. – Full verb

a. Jim made an important claim that.... – Light verb construction
b. Jim claimed that... – Full verb
a. Mary is taking a nap. – Light verb construction
b. Mary is napping. – Full verb

Such alternative formulations lead to the insight that light verb constructions are predicates just like the corresponding full verb alternatives. There can be, however, nuanced differences in meaning across these alternative formulations. The light verb constructions produce possibilities for modification that are less available with the corresponding full verb alternatives.

== Contrasted with auxiliary verbs and full verbs ==
Many verbs that serve as light verbs can also serve as auxiliary verbs and/or full verbs depending on the context in which they appear. Light verbs are similar to auxiliary verbs insofar as they contribute mainly functional content (as opposed to semantic content) to the clauses in which they appear. Light verbs, however, are not auxiliary verbs or full verbs. Light verbs differ from auxiliary verbs in English by not passing the syntactic tests that identify auxiliary verbs. The following examples illustrate that light verbs fail the inversion and negation diagnostics that identify auxiliary verbs:

a. He did call Susan yesterday.
b. Did he call Susan yesterday? – The auxiliary did inverts with the subject.
c. He did not call Susan yesterday. – The auxiliary did can take not as a postdependent.

a. He did the review of my paper yesterday.
b. *Did he the review of my paper yesterday? – The light verb did cannot invert with the subject.
c. *He did not the review of my paper yesterday. – The light verb did cannot take not as a postdependent.

a. He has opened the window.
b. Has he opened the window? – The auxiliary has inverts with the subject.
c. He has not opened the window. – The auxiliary has takes not as a postdependent.

a. She had a smoke.
b. *Had she a smoke? – The light verb had cannot invert with the subject.
c. *She had not a smoke. – The light verb had cannot take not as a postdependent.

Light verbs differ from full verbs in that light verbs lack the semantic content that full verbs have. Full verbs are the core of a predicate, but light verbs form a predicate with another expression (often a noun) with full semantic content. That distinction is more difficult to illustrate, but it can be seen in the following examples involving reflexive pronouns:

a. Jim_{1} took a picture of himself_{1}. – The light verb took requires the reflexive pronoun to appear.
b. *Jim_{1} took a picture of him_{1}. – The light verb took prohibits the simple pronoun from appearing.

a. Jim_{1} took a picture of himself_{1} to school. – The full verb took allows the reflexive pronoun to appear.
b. Jim_{1} took a picture of him_{1} to school. – The full verb took allows the simple pronoun to appear.

a. Sally_{1} gave a description of herself_{1}. – The light verb gave requires the reflexive pronoun to appear.
b. *Sally_{1} gave a description of her_{1}. – The light verb gave prohibits the simple pronoun from appearing.

a. Sally_{1} gave me a description of herself_{1}. – The full verb gave allows the reflexive pronoun to appear
b. Sally_{1} gave me a description of her_{1}. – The full verb gave allows the simple pronoun to appear.

The indices indicate coreference: the two coindexed words denote the same person. The reflexive pronoun must appear with the light verb, but the full verb allows the simple pronoun to appear as well. The distinction has to do with the extent of the predicate. The main predicate reaches down into the noun phrase when the light verb appears, but it excludes the noun phrase when the full verb is present.

== In other languages ==
Examples in other languages include the Yiddish geb in geb a helf (literally give a help, "help"); the French faire in faire semblant (lit. make seeming, "pretend"); the Hindi nikal paRA (lit. leave fall, "start to leave"); and the bǎ construction in Chinese. Light verbs are extremely common in modern Indo-Iranian languages, Japanese, Basque and other languages in which verb compounding is a primary mechanism for marking aspectual distinctions. Light verbs are also equivalent to inherent complement verbs in many Kwa languages such as jo in jo foi 'run' (Ga), tu in tu fo 'advise' (Akan).

=== Australian languages ===
A significant proportion of Australian Aboriginal languages have verbal systems involving light verbs. Many Australian inflecting-verb classes are closed classes and very few in membership. Thus, to express more intricate assertions, matrix verbs are combined with coverbal elements such as preverbs to form complex verbal predicates. In such instances, the matrix verb typically still bears all of the tense–aspect–mood inflection but contributes little to the sentence semantically (i.e. is more of a function word); as noted above, however, they are still distinct from traditional auxiliary verbs.

==== Bardi ====
One such Australian language with prevalent uses of light verbs is Bardi, a Nyulnyulan language spoken in the north of Australia. Although its inflecting-verb class is comparatively large with respect to some other Australian languages (about 230 members), a number of them appear often as light verbs. Comprising the most frequent of these light verbs are the verb roots -ju- 'do, say' and -ma- 'put'. Here is an example of the latter in use:

Arra liyan nga-la-ma
NEG heart 1-IRR-put
"I don’t want to."

In a case such as the above, liyan 'heart' is the preverb containing most of the semantic content. The same is true with goo 'hit' in the following example:

garr nga-na-m-boo-gal
rub 1-TR-PST-hit-REC
'I rubbed him (to stop his pain)'

==== Jingulu ====
Typically, in languages with coverb+light-verb predicates, these words must be directly adjacent; however, in extremely rare cases in languages such as Jingulu, there can be intervening elements between the semantically-rich preverb and the inflected matrix verb. See the following example in which the subject ngaya appears between the preverb ambaya 'speak' and the inflected main verb nu 'do'.

Ambaya ngaya nga-nu Warranganku-mbili
speak 1SG.NOM 1SG-do.PST Beetaloo-LOC
'I spoke about Beetaloo'

This rare but significant phenomenon provides evidence that even in more heavily-agglutinating languages like Jingulu in which the main verb may not be morphologically independent from the preverb, they are in fact light verbs, not inflectional affixes.

== Diachronic considerations ==
Light verbs are interesting to linguists from a variety of perspectives, including those of diachronic linguistics and computational linguistics. From the diachronic perspective, the light verb is said to have evolved from the "heavy" verb through semantic bleaching, a process in which the verb loses some or all of its original semantics. In that sense, the light verb is often viewed as part of a cline:

verb (heavy) → light verb → auxiliary verb → clitic → affix → conjugation

However, the light verb → auxiliary path is disputed since light verbs can remain stable for very long periods (cf. Butt and Lahiri (2013), and both light verbs and auxiliaries can exist in the same languages and be descended from the same full lexical verb but with different meanings.

In computational linguistics, a serious challenge is that of identifying light verb constructions, which require marking light verbs.

== See also ==
- Phrasal verb
- Serial verb – compound of multiple "heavy" verbs
- Stretched verb
