= Serial verb construction =

Construction of verb compounds in some languages

The serial verb construction, also known as (verb) serialization or verb stacking, is a syntactic phenomenon in which two or more verbs or verb phrases are strung together in a single clause. It is a common feature of many African, Asian and New Guinean languages. Serial verb constructions are often described as coding a single event; they can also be used to indicate concurrent or causally-related events.

== Uses ==
The terms "serial verbs", "serialization", etc. are used by different authors to denote somewhat different sets of constructions. There are also differences in how the constructions are analyzed in terms of both syntax and semantics.

In general, a structure described as a serial verb construction will consist either of two (or possibly more) consecutive verbs or of two or more consecutive verb phrases in which each verb may have its own object and possibly other modifiers. There will usually be no marking, by means of affixes or subordinating conjunctions, that one verb is dependent on the other, and they will not be linked by coordinating conjunctions. Some linguists insist that serial verbs cannot be dependent on each other; however, if a language does not mark dependent verbs with affixation, it can be difficult to determine whether any dependency relation exists when verbs appear in sequence.

Serial verbs normally denote actions that are closely connected and can be considered to be part of the same event. They may be actions taking place simultaneously, or one may represent the cause, purpose or result of the other. In most cases, the serial verbs in a sequence are understood to share the same subject.

Certain expressions resembling serial verb construction are found in English (surviving from Early Modern English), such as let's go eat and come live with me. In such constructions, the second verb would normally be regarded as a bare infinitive (and can generally be replaced by a "full" infinitive by the insertion of to before it).

== Examples with consecutive verbs ==
This sentence in Persian contains 19 consecutive verbs:

داشتم، می‌رفتم، دیدم، گرفته، نشسته، گفتم، بذار، بپرسم، ببینم، می‌آد، نمی‌آد، دیدم، می‌گه، نمی‌خوام، بیام، می‌خوام، برم، بگیرم، بخوابم!

Transcription: dâštam miraftam didam gerefte nešaste goftam bezâr beporsam bebinam miyâd nemiyâd didam mige nemixâm biyâm mixâm beram begiram bexâbam!

Translation: I was heading out and saw that she/he had taken a seat, I said "let me ask and see if she/he would come or wouldn't come," she/he says "I don't want to come I want to go get some sleep!.

The following example of serialization comes from the Nupe language from Nigeria:

Musa bé lá èbi.
Musa came took knife
"Musa came to take the knife."

The two verbs bé and lá appear consecutively, with no linking word (like "and") or anything else to indicate that one verb is subordinate to the other. The subject, "Musa", is understood to apply to both verbs. In this example, the second verb also has a direct object. Note that in the English version given, the second verb is translated by an infinitive, "to take", which is marked as subordinate to the first verb.

Depending on the language, the shared subject may be marked on both verbs or only one. In most of the examples, it is marked only once. However, in the following example from the Baré, in the Upper Amazon, the first-person singular subject ("I") is marked twice:

nu-takasã nu-dúmaka.
deceived(1SG) sleep(1SG)
"I pretended (that) I was asleep."

A similar construction is also found in most varieties of dialectal Arabic. The following example is from Lebanese Arabic:

ṣurt jarrib aḥki inglīzi
became(1SG) try(1SG) speak(1SG) English
"I started trying to speak English."

As a rule, serial verbs cannot be marked independently for categories such as tense, aspect and mood. Either all of the verbs are marked for the same features, or a sole marker is shared by all of them. In the Hindi फ़ोन उठा-कर कहा fon uṭhā-kar kahā (literally, phone pick-up say (PAST)), "picked up the phone and said", only the second verb is marked as past tense, but both are understood to refer to the past. In the following example, from Ewe, in West Africa, both verbs appear in their perfective form:

Kofí trɔ dzo kpoo
Kofi turn(PFV) leave(PFV) quietly
"Kofi turned and left quietly."

In Japanese, two verbs may come together with the first verb in the continuative form (Japanese: 連用形, romanized: ren'yōkei), as in oshitōru (押し通る) ("push through"), in which oshi is the continuative form of osu ("push"), and tōru ("get through") is a finite form whose present tense and indicative mood are understood to apply to oshi. Similarly, tobikomu (飛び込む) ("jump in") in which tobi is from tobu ("jump"), and komu means "go in"; dekiagaru (出来上がる) ("be completed"), where deki is from dekiru ("be able to be done") and agaru means "rise, be offered". No arguments can come between the two verbs in this construction (in contrast to those described in the following section).

In the case of negation, only one negator can be applied to the whole serial construction, as in the following example in Baré:

hena nihiwawaka nu-tšereka nu-yaka-u abi
NEG go(1SG) speak(1SG) mother(1SG) with
"I am not going to talk with my mother."

In Chinese, as in other Southeast Asian languages, when a transitive verb is followed by an intransitive verb, the object of the combined verb may be understood as the object of the first verb and the subject of the second: 老虎咬死了張; lǎohǔ yǎosǐ le Zhāng; 'tiger bite-die PERF Zhang' "the tiger bit Zhang to death", where Zhang is understood as the direct object of yǎo ("bite") but as the subject of sǐ ("die"). In the equivalent construction in Hindi, the one who dies would be the tiger, not Zhang. (See Chinese grammar for more information.)

In the following example from Maonan, a language spoken in southwestern China, up to ten verbs co-occur in a sentence coding a single event without any linking words, coordinating conjunctions or any other markings:

ɦe2 sə:ŋ3 lət8 pa:i1 dzau4 van6 ma1 ɕa5 vɛ4 kau5 fin1 kam5
1SG want walk go take return come try do look accomplish PCL:Q
"Could I walk there to bring (it) back and try (it)?"

In Santali, apart from serial compound verbs, a rare serial verb construction denotes distinct sub-events/quasi-synonymous events of the same situation and also serializes TAM/person in the syntagmas, where the pronominal object markers appear twice, but the indicative marker occurs only once in the final verb.

bhəgtɛ=ko raɽa-led-e ɲam-led-e uni tərup' dɔ=e rɔr-gɔt-ked-a
quickly=3PL.SUBJ release-ACT.ANT-3SG.OBJ find-ACT.ANT-3SG.OBJ that.ANIM leopard TOP=3SG.SUBJ speak-AUX-ACT.AOR-FIN
"No sooner had they let him out and found him than the leopard said."

== Examples with intervening elements between verbs ==
In some languages that have verb serialization, the verbs must appear consecutively, with nothing intervening. In other languages, however, it is possible for arguments, normally the object of one of the verbs, to come in between the serialized verbs. The resulting construction is a sequence of verb phrases, rather than of plain verbs. The following example is from Yoruba, from Nigeria:

ó mú ìwé wá
he took book came
"He brought the book."

The object of the first verb intervenes between the verbs, resulting in two consecutive verb phrases, the first meaning "took the book" and the second "came". As before, the subject ("he" in this case) is understood to apply to both verbs. The combined action of taking the book and coming can be translated as "bringing" the book.

A serial verb construction may be used to introduce an actant ("money" in the following example, from Akan of West Africa):

Aémmaá de sikaá maá Kofä
Amma take money give Kofi
"Amma gives Kofi money."

Also in Japanese, strings of verb phrases can be created, often denoting events that are related causally or in time. Such strings may be translated into English by using "and", "while", "(in order) to" or other connectives, but some may have a more compact translation, as in the following example (from Hayao Miyazaki's Mononoke Hime) in which the actions of "following" and "coming" are simultaneous:

足跡 を たどって 来た
ashi-ato o tadotte kita
footprint OBJ following came
"I followed him here."

== Contrast with compound verbs ==
A distinction is sometimes made between serial verbs and compound verbs (also known as complex predicates). In a compound verb, the first element (verb or noun) generally carries most of the semantic load, and the second element, often called a vector verb (light verb) or explicator verb, provides fine distinctions (such as the speaker's attitude or grammatical aspect) and carries the inflection (markers of tense, mood and agreement).

The first element may be a verb in the conjunctive participle form, as in Hindi and Punjabi. For example, in Hindi, in the second example below, लिया (liyā) (from the verb लेना lenā "to take") is a vector verb that indicates a completed action which is done for one's own benefit, and खा (khā) "eat" is the main or primary verb. In the third example below, डाला (ḍālā) (from the verb डालना ḍālnā "to put" or "to insert") is the vector verb, which indicates recklessness, gruesomeness, or an unwanted action.

Both खा लिया (khā liyā) and खा डाला (khā ḍālā) alternate with the corresponding perfective form of the main verb (in this case, खाया khāyā "ate") under partly specifiable semantic and pragmatic conditions.

उसने आम खाया
usne ām khāyā
he/she.ERG mango.NOM.M eat.PFV.M
"he/she ate the mango"

उसने आम खा लिया
usne ām khā liyā
he/she.ERG mango.NOM.M eat.NF take.PFV.M
"he/she finished eating the mango"

उसने आम को खा डाला
usne ām ko khā ḍālā
he/she.ERG mango.OBL.M ACC eat.NF put.PFV.M
"he/she devoured the mango"

Negating the compound verbs in the indicative mood usually suppresses the vector verb in favor of their non-compound counterparts. This following sentence makes use of the vector verb लेना (lenā) "to take", which is dropped in the negative:

*उसने आम नहीं खा लिया
*usne ām nahī̃ khā liyā
he/she.ERG mango.NOM.M NEG.IND eat.NF take.PFV.M
intendedː "he/she did not eat the mango"

उसने आम नहीं खाया
usne ām nahī̃ khāyā
he/she.ERG mango.NOM.M NEG.IND eat.PFV.M
"he/she did not eat the mango"

However, compound verbs in the subjunctive mood retain the vector verbs when the former are negated.

उसने आम खा ना लिया हो
usne ām khā nā liyā ho
he/she.ERG mango.NOM.M eat.NF NEG.SUBJ take.PFV be.3S.SUBJ.PRS
"(I hope that) he/she hasn't eaten the mango"

उसने आम खा ना डाला हो
usne ām khā nā ḍālā ho
he/she.ERG mango.NOM.M eat.NF NEG.SUBJ put.PFV be.3S.SUBJ.PRS
"(I hope that) he/she hasn't devoured the mango"

== See also ==
- Genitive construction

== Sources ==
- Aikhenvald, Alexandra Y. and R.M.W. Dixon. 2006. Serial Verb Constructions: a cross-linguistic typology. (Explorations in Linguistic Typology, 2.) Oxford: Oxford University Press.
- Crowley, Terry. 2002. Serial Verbs in Oceanic: A Descriptive Typology. Oxford: Oxford University Press.
- Haspelmath, Martin. 2016. The serial verb construction: Comparative concept and cross-linguistic generalizations. Language and Linguistics 17(3). 291–319. DOI:http://doi.org/10.1177/2397002215626895.
