= English phrasal verbs =

Concept in English grammar

In the traditional grammar of Modern English, a phrasal verb typically constitutes a single semantic unit consisting of a verb followed by a particle (e.g., turn down, run into, or sit up), sometimes collocated with a preposition (e.g., get together with, run out of, or feed off of).

Phrasal verbs ordinarily cannot be understood based upon the meanings of the individual parts alone but must be considered as a whole: the meaning is non-compositional and thus unpredictable. (Note: That unpredictability of meaning is the defining trait of phrasal verb constructions is widely assumed. See for instance Huddleston & Pullum 2002, p. 273, and Allerton 2006, p. 166.) Phrasal verbs are differentiated from other classifications of multi-word verbs and free combinations by the criteria of idiomaticity, replacement by a single verb, wh-question formation and particle movement.

== Terminology ==
In 1900, Frederick Schmidt referred to particle verbs in the Middle English writings of Reginald Pecock as "phrasal verbs" though apparently without intending it as a technical term. The term was popularized by Logan Pearsall Smith in Words and Idioms (1925) in which he states that the OED editor Henry Bradley suggested it to him.

This terminology is mainly used in teaching English as a second language. Some textbooks apply the term "phrasal verb" primarily to verbs with particles to distinguish phrasal verbs from verb phrases composed of a verb and a collocated preposition. (Note: For examples of accounts that use the term phrasal verb to denote particle verbs only (not prepositional verbs), see for instance Tallerman (1998:130), Adger (2003:99f.) and Haiden (2006).) Others include verbs with prepositions under the same category and distinguish particle verbs and prepositional verbs as two types of phrasal verbs. (Note: For example, the series "English File" uses phrasal verbs in this way. This exercise on the English File website features both types of verbs under the term "phrasal verbs". elt.oup.com) Since a prepositional phrase can complement a particle verb, some explanations distinguish three types of phrasal verb constructions depending on whether the verb combines with a particle, a prepositional phrase, or both, though the third type is not a distinct linguistic phenomenon. Finally, some linguists reject the term altogether. (Note: Huddleston & Pullum 2002, p. 274 reject the term phrasal verb because the relevant word combinations often do not form phrases.)

== Types ==
=== Verb + particle (particle verbs) ===
Particle verbs (phrasal verbs in the strict sense) are two-word verbs composed of a simple verb and a particle extension that modifies its meaning. The particle is thus integrally collocated with the verb. In older grammars, the particle was usually analyzed as an adverb.

a. Kids grow up so fast these days
b. You shouldn't give in so easily.

In those examples, the common verbs grow and give are complemented by the particles up and in. The resulting two-word verbs are single semantic units, and so grow up and give in are listed as discrete entries in modern dictionaries.

These verbs can be transitive or intransitive. If they are transitive, i.e. if they have an object, the particle may come either before or after the object of the verb.

c. She handed in her homework.
d. She handed her homework in.
e. She handed it in.

When the object is a single pronoun, the particle is usually placed afterwards. With nouns, it is a matter of familiar collocation or of emphasis.

Particles commonly used in this construction include to, in, into, out, up, down, at, on, off, under, against. (Note: For a list of the particles that occur with phrasal verbs, see Jurafsky & Martin 2000, p. 319.) All these words can also be used as prepositions, but the prepositional use is distinct, and modern dictionaries may list, for example, to (particle) and to (preposition) as separate lexemes. (Note: e.g. Miriam Webster) In the particle verb construction, they cannot be construed as prepositions because they are not being used as part of a prepositional phrase.

f. You should think it over. – over cannot be a preposition, as it is not followed by a noun phrase.
g. Who thought up this scheme? – although up is followed by a noun phrase, it is linked to the verb (to think up), not to the noun (*up this scheme), so not a preposition.

=== Verb + preposition (prepositional verbs) ===
Many verbs can be complemented by a prepositional phrase that functions adverbially:

a. Don't stand on the table.

This construction is sometimes also taught as a phrasal verb, but only when the combination of verb and preposition is not intuitive to the learner:

b. Don't stand on ceremony.

Further examples:

c. I ran into an old friend. – into is a preposition that introduces the prepositional phrase into an old friend.
d. She takes after her mother. – after is a preposition that introduces the prepositional phrase after her mother.
e. Sam passes for a linguist. – for is a preposition that introduces the prepositional phrase for a linguist.
f. You should stand by your friend. – by is a preposition that introduces the prepositional phrase by your friend

=== Verb + particle + preposition (particle-prepositional verbs) ===
Sometimes, both phenomena can occur in the same context.

a. Who can put up with that? – up is a particle and with is a preposition.
b. She looks forward to a rest. – forward is a particle and to is a preposition.
c. The other tanks bore down on my Panther. – down is a particle and on is a preposition.
d. They really teed off on me. – off is a particle and on is a preposition.
e. We loaded up on snacks. – up is a particle and on is a preposition
f. Susan had to sit in for me. – in is a particle and for is a preposition.

In general, the discrete meanings associated with phrasal verbs cannot be readily understood solely by construing the sum of their respective parts: the meaning of pick up is distinct from the various meanings of pick and up, and may acquire disparate meanings depending on its contextual usage. Similarly, the meaning of hang out is not conspicuously related to a particular definition of hang or out.

== Distinguishing phrasal verb types ==
When a particle verb is transitive, it may be difficult to distinguish the particle from a preposition. (Note: For more on how this confusion played into the old controversy about prepositions at the end of sentences, see Preposition stranding#Controversy) A simple diagnostic that works in many cases is to consider whether it is possible to shift the preposition/particle to after the noun. An English preposition can never follow its noun, and so if we can change verb - P - noun to verb - noun - P, P cannot be a preposition and must be a particle. (Note: For more on the shifting diagnostic used to distinguish particle verbs from prepositional verbs, see Tallerman (1998:129).) But even with a particle verb, shifting the particle is not always possible, for example, if it is followed by a pronoun instead of a noun, or if there is a fixed collocation. A second diagnostic is to think about where the instinctive division would be if we had to take a breath in the middle of the phrase. A particle would naturally be grouped with the preceding verb and a preposition with the following noun phrase. (Note: For more on the difference between particles and prepositions with phrasal verbs, see Jurafsky & Martin 2000, p. 318.) In the following examples, which show both of these approaches, an asterisk indicates an impossible form.

a. You can bank on Susan. – on is a preposition. The natural division is "bank | on Susan".
b. *You can bank Susan on. – The preposition cannot follow its noun.

a. You can take on Susan. – on is a particle. The natural division is "take on | Susan".
b. You can take Susan on. – The particle can follow the object of the particle verb.

a. He got over the situation. – over is a preposition. The natural division is "get | over the situation".
b. *He got the situation over. – The preposition cannot follow its noun.

a. He thought over the situation. – over is a particle. The natural division is "think over | the situation".
b. He thought the situation over. – The particle can follow the object of the particle verb.

A third test, which probes further into the question of the natural division, would be to insert an adverb or adverbial between the verb and the particle/preposition. That is possible with a following prepositional phrase but not if the adverbial is intruding between the two parts of a particle verb.

a. You can bank without reservation on Susan. – The adverbial can fall in the natural division: "bank | on Susan".
b. *You can take without reservation on Susan. – The collocation "take on" cannot naturally be divided by an adverbial.

A fourth test would be to place the verb in a w-question (which? who?) or a relative clause and consider whether the particle/preposition can be placed before the question word or relative pronoun. While that may sound antiquated, it is always possible with a preposition but never with a particle. (For more on an obsolete prescriptive rule about that, see preposition stranding.)

a. Who can you bank on? Susan is someone (who) you can bank on. – on is a preposition in terminal position.
b. On whom can you bank? Susan is a person on whom you can bank. – The preposition can go before the w-words.

a. Who can I take on? Susan is someone (who) any employer could take on. – on is a particle in terminal position.
b. *On whom can I take? *Susan is a person on whom any employer could take. – The particle cannot be moved.

While the distinction is of interest to linguists, it is not necessarily important for language learners, and some textbooks recommend learning phrasal verbs as whole collocations without the types being considered.

== Shifting ==
A complex aspect of phrasal verbs concerns the syntax of particle verbs that are transitive (as discussed and illustrated above). They allow some variability, depending on the relative weight of the constituents involved. Shifting often occurs when the object is very light:

a. Fred chatted up the girl with red hair. – Canonical word order
b. Fred chatted her up. – Shifting occurs because the definite pronoun her is very light.
c. Fred chatted the girl up. - The girl is also very light.
d. ^{?}Fred chatted the redhead up. - A three-syllable object can appear in either position for many speakers.
e. ^{??}Fred chatted the girl with red hair up. – Shifting is unlikely unless it is sufficiently motivated by the weight of the constituents involved.

a. They dropped off the kids from that war zone. – Canonical word order
b. They dropped them off. – Shifting occurs because the definite pronoun them is very light.
c. ^{??}They dropped the kids from that war zone off. – Shifting is unlikely unless it is sufficiently motivated by the weight of the constituents involved.

a. Mary made up a really entertaining story. – Canonical word order
b. Mary made it up. – Shifting occurs because the definite pronoun it is very light.
c. ^{??}Mary made a really entertaining story up. – Shifting is unlikely unless it is sufficiently motivated by the weight of the constituents involved.

Shifting occurs between two (or more) sister constituents that appear on the same side of their head. The lighter constituent shifts leftward and the heavier constituent shifts rightward, and this happens to accommodate the relative weight of the two. Dependency grammar trees are again used to illustrate the point:

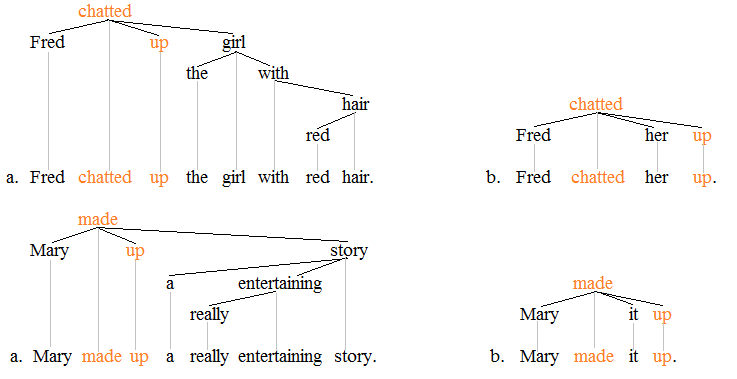

The trees illustrate when shifting can occur. English sentence structures that grow down and to the right are easier to process. There is a consistent tendency to place heavier constituents to the right, as is evident in the a-trees. Shifting is possible when the resulting structure does not contradict that tendency, as is evident in the b-trees. Note again that the particle verb constructions (in orange) qualify as catenae in both the a- and b-trees. Shifting does not alter that fact.

== Compounding ==
An extension of the concept of phrasal verb occurs via compounding when a verb+particle complex is nominalized. The particles may come before or after the verb. If it comes after, there may be a hyphen between the two parts of the compound noun.

to set out → outset:

We set out on a quest for the holy grail.
Our quest was doomed from the outset.

to put in → input:

Don't be scared to put your own ideas in.
Try to come to the meeting – we'd value your input.

to stand by → standby:

The fire brigade is standing by in case of emergency.
We are keeping the old equipment on standby in case of emergency.

to back up → back-up:

Neil will back you up if you need it
Neil will give you any backup you need.

Compounds which place the particle before the verb are of ancient development and are common to all Germanic languages, as well as to other Indo-European languages. That is related to the history of particle verbs, which developed out of Old English prefixed verbs. By contrast, compounds that put the particle second are a more modern development in English and focus more on the action that is expressed by the compound.

== Origins and analogues ==
Prepositional verbs are very common in many languages, but would not necessarily be analyzed as a distinct verb type: they are simply verbs followed by prepositional phrases. By contrast, particle verbs are much rarer in cross-language comparison, and their origins need some explanation.

Particle verbs are common in Middle English and operate in much the same way as in the modern language. Middle English particle verbs developed from Old English prefixed verbs: OE inngan > English go in. Similar constructions are common in other Germanic languages.

=== Parallels in other Germanic languages ===
English phrasal verbs are related to the separable verbs in other West Germanic languages such as in Dutch:

a. Ik moet de lamp aansteken - 'I have to put on the lamp': aan- / an- is prefixed to the infinitive.
b. Ik steek de lamp aan - 'I am putting on the lamp': aan / an stands separately at the end of the principal clause.

In these languages, the particle can appear either before or after the base verb according to the same rules that would apply to any other type of adverb. When it comes in front of the verb, the spelling convention is to write the two parts together as one word, and since that happens in the infinitive, which is the dictionary form, the particle is traditionally conceived of as a prefix that separates under certain circumstances. It would be equally possible to see it as an adverb/particle that is strongly collocated with the verb. Compare German ankommen (arrive), a separable verb, with bald kommen (come soon), a random combination of verb and adverb:

c. Ich komme an / komme bald. - 'I arrive / come soon.' - present, particle follows verb as in English
d. Ich kam an / kam bald. - 'I arrived / came soon.' - preterite, particle follows verb as in English
e. ...dass ich ankomme / bald komme. - '...that I arrive / come soon.' - present, verb in final position in subordinate clause
f. Ich will ankommen / bald kommen. - 'I want to arrive / come soon.' - simple infinitive, particle prefixed
g. Ich hoffe anzukommen / bald zu kommen. - 'I hope to arrive / come soon.' - infinitive with marker which is also prefixed
h. Ich bin angekommen / bald gekommen. - 'I have arrived / come soon.' - perfect, particle prefixed

=== Similar constructions in non-Germanic languages ===
A number of particle verbs exist in some Romance languages, such as Lombard, spoken in Northern Italy: Fa foeura (to do in: to eat up; to squander); Dà denter (to trade in; to bump into); Borlà giò (to fall down); Lavà sü (to wash up, as in English); Trà sü (to throw up, as in English); Trà vìa (to throw away, as in English); Serà sü (to lock up, as in English); Dà vià (to give away, as in English), and more. Some of these made their way into Italian, for instance far fuori (to get rid of); mangiare fuori (to eat out); andare d'accordo con (to get on/along with); buttare via (throw away).

In Portuguese, some phrasal verbs are uncommon. Three phrasal verbs in Portuguese are commonly used: ir embora, jogar fora and fazer de conta. Some other phrasal verbs are estar perante, ficar de, usar-me como and ter medo.

== See also ==
- Adverbial phrase
- Collocation
- Ergative verb
- Idiom
- Lexical unit
- Verb phrase

== Literature cited ==
- Adger, D. 2003. Core syntax: A minimalist approach. Oxford, UK: Oxford University Press.
- Allerton, David (2006). "7. Verbs and Their Satellites". In Aarts, Bas; McMahon, April (eds.). The Handbook of English Linguistics. Blackwell handbooks in linguistics. Oxford: Blackwell Publishing. pp. 126–149. ISBN 9781405113823. OCLC 64624837.
- Biber, Douglas (2012). Longman grammar of spoken and written English. Longman. ISBN 978-0-582-23725-4. OCLC 809001730.
- Declerck, Renaat (1991). A comprehensive descriptive grammar of English. Tokyo: Kaitakusha. ISBN 9784758905381. OCLC 28173976.
- Fowler, Henry Watson (1926). "Preposition at end". A Dictionary of Modern English Usage. OUP. p. 457. (Cited from the revised ed. 1940).
- Haiden, M. 2006. “Verb particle constructions”, in The Blackwell companion to syntax, vol. 5. Eds. M. Everaert & Henk van
- Huddleston, Rodney; Pullum, Geoffrey K. (2002). The Cambridge grammar of the English language. Cambridge University Press. ISBN 9780521527613. OCLC 947200729.
- Jurafsky, Dan; Martin, James H. (2000). Speech and Language Processing: An Introduction to Natural Language Processing, Computational Linguistics, and Speech Recognition. New Delhi: Pearson Education. ISBN 9788178085944. OCLC 64571393.
- Lamont, George (2005). "The Historical Rise of the English Phrasal Verb". Archived from the original on 2012-10-25.
- McArthur, Tom (1992). The Oxford companion to the English language. Oxford University Press.
- Ogura, Michiko (1995). "The interchangeability of Old English verbal prefixes". Anglo-Saxon England . 24: 67–93. doi:10.1017/S026367510000466X. JSTOR 44510022. S2CID 162430958.
- Quirk, Randolph (1985). A Comprehensive grammar of the English language. London: Longman. ISBN 0-582-51734-6. OCLC 11533395.
- Schmidt, Frederick (1900). Studies in the Language of Pecock. Upsala: Almqvist & Wiksell.
- Sinclair, John (1995). Collins Cobuild English Grammar. London: HarperCollins.
- Smith, Logan P. (1925). Words and Idioms (Second ed.). London: Constable and Company. p. 172.
- Tallerman, M. 1998. Understanding syntax. London: Arnold.
- Thomson, Audrey J.; Martinet, Agnes V. (1993). A Practical English Grammar (4th ed.). Oxford: Oxford University Press.
