= Nagasaki dialect =

Japanese dialect spoken in Nagasaki Prefecture, Japan

- 長崎弁
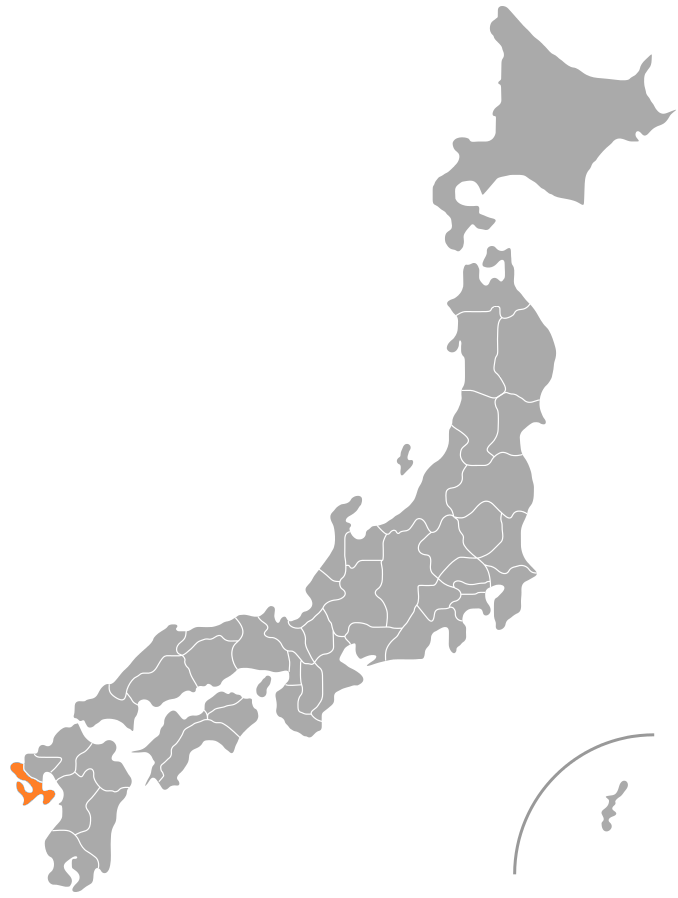
- Nagasaki dialect area (orange).
- Native to: Japan
- Region: Mainland Nagasaki Prefecture, Kyushu
- Language family: Japonic: Japanese; Kyushu; Hichiku; Nagasaki dialect
- Dialects: Central-Southern; Northern

Language codes
- ISO 639-3: –
- Glottolog: naga1405 Nagasaki-ben

The Nagasaki dialect (Japanese: 長崎弁, Nagasaki ben) is the name given to the dialect of Japanese spoken on the mainland part of Nagasaki Prefecture on the island of Kyushu. It is a major dialect of the wider Hichiku group of Kyushu Japanese, with similarities to the Chikuzen (including Hakata) and Kumamoto dialects, among others. It is one of the better known Hichiku dialects within Japan, with various historical proverbs that relate to its regional flavour.

== Sub-dialects ==
There are several regional sub-dialects of the broader Nagasaki dialect, which are commonly divided into two main groups: Central-Southern and Northern. Of these, the Central-Southern dialect is further divided as shown below.

- Central-Southern sub-dialect
  - Nagasaki – Nagasaki city.
  - Sonogi – Omura, Sonogi district and Saikai.
  - Isahaya – Isahaya city, Yagami and Toishi.
  - Shimabara – Unzen, Shimabara city and Minamishimabara.
- Northern sub-dialect – Sasebo, Matsuura, Hirado and Kitamatsuura district.

Central-Southern and Northern differ in pitch accent, with the former possessing non-accent and the latter having a southwestern Kyushu-standard accent. They also differ grammatically, with Northern having similarities with the dialects of western Saga Prefecture. Within Central-Southern, the dialect of Nagasaki city retains vocabulary of Chinese and Dutch origin, owed to the city's close ties to the Shogunate during the Edo period. The other divisions have been drawn to match the historical territories of Nagasaki Prefecture, which are thought to have led to the observable differences in the present day.

== Phonology ==
=== Diphthongs ===
The diphthongs ai (あい), oi (おい) and ui (うい) experience merging in the Nagasaki dialect. For example, the dai- (だい-) in daikon (だいこん radish) becomes jaa- (じゃあ) to make jaakon (じゃあこん), ototoi (おととい day before yesterday) becomes ototee (おとてぇ) and suika (すいか watermelon) is said shiika (しいか). Conversely, the diphthong ei (えい) is unaffected, so that tokei (とけい clock) is pronounced the same as in standard Japanese. Like other Kyushu dialects, the long o (お) sound derived from the diphthongs oo (おお), ou (おう) or eu (えう) is pronounced uu (うう). Examples of diphthong merging in the Nagasaki dialect are shown below.

- Long o becoming a long u:
  - Kyou (きょうtoday) becomes kyuu (きゅう), kefu (けふ) or keu (けう).
  - Youjin (ようじん precaution) becomes yuujin (ゆうじん).
  - Isshou (いっしょう) becomes isshuu (いっしゅう).
  - Shiyou (しようlet’s ~) becomes seu (せう) or shuu (しゅう).
- Long o derived from au:
  - Amaku (あまくsweet(ly)) becomes amau (あまう) or amou (あもう).
  - Isshou (いっしょう whole life) becomes isshau (いっしゃう).

=== Consonants ===
Unlike other Kyushu dialects, the Nagasaki dialect does not distinguish between the yotsugana (ji (じ) and zi (ぢ), and zu (ず) and dzu (づ). The consonants ga (が), gi (ぎ), gu (ぐ), ge (げ) and go (ご) lose their vowel sounds to become simply g / [g]. There remain some sounds in the Nagasaki dialect spoken predominantly by older speakers which are not found in standard Japanese. These include she (しぇ) and je (じぇ), which are now commonly pronounced as se (せ) and ze (ぜ) by younger speakers, as well as the labialized velar consonants kwa (くゎ) and gwa (ぐゎ). The r-starting consonants (ra (ら), ri (り), ru (る), re (れ) and ro (ろ)) can also experience elision when found within a word, leading to the omission of the consonant sound (r-). For example, are (あれ that) becomes ai (あい).

=== Nasalised n (ん) and geminate consonant (っ) insertion ===
In the Nagasaki dialect, ru-ending verbs may have their eponymous ending replaced with a geminate consonant (small tsu (っ)). For example, kuru (来る to come) becomes ku- (来っ) and kangaeru (考える to think) becomes kangayu- (考ゆっ). Similarly to ru-ending verbs, the plain dialectal form of i- and na- adjectives may also have its ending changed to a geminate consonant. E.g., takaka (高か tall) becomes takka (たっか). Aside from when starting a word, n-starting consonants (na (な), ni (に), nu (ぬ), ne (ね), no (の)) and m-starting consonants (ma (ま), mi (み), mu (む), me め, mo (も)) often change to a nasalised n (ん). For example, inu (いぬ dog) becomes in (いん) and tsumetai (つめたい cold) becomes tsuntaka (つんたか).

=== Phonology of the Shimabara sub-dialect ===
The sub-dialect of Shimabara possesses several notable phonological differences with the rest of the Nagasaki dialect area. Certain s-starting voiced consonants (za (ざ), ze (ぜ), zo (ぞ)) become pronounced with a leading d / [d] instead, resulting in pronunciations closer to da (だ), de (で) and do (ど). In addition, ri (り) and ryo (りょ) may be said as zi (ぢ) and dzo (ぢょ), respectively. i / [i] may also be replaced by a u / [u] sound so that tori (とり bird) becomes toru (とる) and awabi (あわび abalone) becomes awabu (あわぶ).

== Pitch accent ==
The Central-Southern sub-dialect group of the Nagasaki dialect possesses a so-called ‘second-type’ (nikei (二型)) pitch accent of the wider southwestern Kyushu-standard pitch accent. It shares this trait with Kagoshima Prefecture and the western part of Kumamoto Prefecture. This pitch accent has generally consistent rules which change based on the number of mora and type of word; second-type pitch accent distinguishes between two major noun types, ‘A’ and ‘B’. ‘A’-type nouns are generally pronounced with a higher pitch towards the start of the word. For example, kaze (かぜ wind) or katachi (かたち shape). This higher pitch never exceeds the second mora, regardless of the length of the word. In contrast, ‘B’-type nouns are pronounced with a higher pitch only on the final mora. For example, haru (はる spring) or kaminari (かみなり thunder). Pitch accent can change when particles are attached to the word. For ‘A’-type nouns, an extra particle could ‘extend’ the length of a two-mora noun so that it is usually non-accented second mora is stressed. For example, kaze becomes kaze when the particle ga (が) is attached to (kaze ga (かぜが). Similarly, ‘B’-type nouns can have the stress usually found on their final mora transferred to the addended particle instead. For example, haru becomes haru when ga is attached (haru ga (はるが)). Among younger speakers, ‘A’-type nouns can have the stress on their first mora transferred to the second mora when a particle is attached, so that kaze ga (かぜが) becomes kaze ga (かぜが). Additionally, in regions close to Saga Prefecture and around Shimabara city, ‘A’-type nouns may not have their stress extended to the second mora when a particle is addended. E.g., kaze ga (かぜが) remains kaze ga (かぜが). The table below shows some examples of pitch accent in the Central-Southern Nagasaki sub-dialect.

| Noun type | Two-mora | Three-mora | Four-mora |
| A | Kaze (かぜ) Chi ga (ちが) | Katachi (かたち) Kaze ga (かぜが) | Kamaboko (かまぼこ) Katachi ga (かたちか) |
| B | Haru (はる) Te ga (てが) | Inochi (いのち) Haru ga (はるが) | Kaminari (かみなり) Inochi ga (いのちが) |

Unlike the Central-Southern sub-dialects, the Northern sub-dialect does not possess any discernible pitch accent, with all words pronounced flat.

== Grammar ==
=== Verbs ===
The inflection of verbs differs considerably between the Nagasaki dialect and standard Japanese. The table below shows the differences in conjugation between Standard Japanese and the Nagasaki dialect for the Ichidan verb ukeru (受ける to receive).

| Form | Standard Japanese | Nagasaki dialect |
|---|---|---|
| Plain/dictionary | Ukeru (受ける receive) | Ukuru (受くる) |
| Negative | Ukenai (受けない do not receive) | Uken (受けん) |
| -masu stem | Uke- (受け-) | Uke- (受け-) |
| Hypothetical | Ukereba (受ければ if I receive) | Ukureba (受くれば) |
| Imperative | Ukero (受けろreceive) | Ukero (受けろ) |

Traditionally, for the volitional and persuasive form (shiyou (しよう) let’s ~), Ichidan verbs with an -iru (-いる) ending are conjugated with a palatalised -u (-う) sound. For example, okiru (起きる to wake up) is conjugated to okyuu (起きゅう) as opposed to okiyou (起きよう) (with both meaning let's get up). Likewise, some former Nidan verbs such as deru (出る to go out) are palatalised (in this case to juu (じゅう) or zuu (ずう) instead of deyou (出よう) (all meaning let's go out)). A more recent conjugation pattern has also emerged in which Ichidan and former Nidan verbs are conjugated as if they are Godan verbs. E.g., okirou (起きろう) and dero (出ろう).

The te- (て-) and past tense form of certain verbs experience euphony in the Nagasaki dialect. These include verbs ending in -u (-う), -bu (-ぶ) and -mu (-む), as well as those ending in -su (-す). For the former three, a u sound is inserted as shown in the examples below.

- U-ending verb example: kau (買う to buy)
  - Katta (買った bought) is said kauta (買うた) or kouta (こうた).
- Bu-ending verb example: hakobu (運ぶ to carry)
  - Hakonda (運んだ carried) is said as hakouda (運うだ) or hakuuda (はくうだ).
- Mu-ending verb example: yomu (読む to read)
  - Yonda (読んだ read) is said youda (読うだ) or yuuda (ゆうだ).

For the latter, an i (い) sound is inserted as shown in the example below.

- Su-ending verb example: dasu (出す to take out)
  - Dashita (出した took out) is said as daita (出いた) or jaata (じゃあた).

A report in 1998 found that among these instances of euphony, in particular the insertion of -u in -bu and -mu ending verbs was vanishing among younger speakers, with most conjugating in concordance with standard Japanese.

For polite speech, the Nagasaki dialect makes use of the bound auxiliary -masu (-ます), albeit often with geminate consonant (small tsu (っ)) insertion. For example, shirimasen (知りません I don’t know (polite)) may be said as shirimassen (知りまっせん). Like standard Japanese, speakers of the Nagasaki dialect may contract the hypothetical form of verbs. For example, kakeba (書けば if I write) may be said kakya (書きゃ) and sureba (すれば if I do), surya (すりゃ).

=== Adjectives ===
Like other Hichiku dialects, the Nagasaki dialect possesses several notable differences regarding i-adjectives when compared to standard Japanese. For the plain and attributive form, the eponymous ending -i (-い) is replaced with ka (か). For example, akai (赤い red) becomes akaka (赤か) and shiroi (白い white) becomes shiroka (白か). The connective -ku (-く) is contracted to -u (-う), leading to conjugations such as younaka (良うなか) (yokunai (良くない not good)). The continuative form, -kute (-くてand), is changed to -shite (-して), so that yokute (良くて good and…) is said youshite (良うして). Unlike standard Japanese, which simply addends darou (だろう probably, could be) to the end of all adjective types to express conjecture, i-adjectives in the Nagasaki dialect can be conjugated. -rou (-ろう) is added to the plain form to create expressions such as yokarou (良かろう it’s good, right?) or shirokarou (白かろうI wonder if it’s white). Alternatively, an equivalent to darou, jarou (じゃろう), can be directly added to the end of the adjective like in yokajarou (良かじゃろう) or shirokajarou (白じゃろう). For the hypothetical form, -kereba (-ければ if its…) is changed to -kareba (-かれば), which may be contracted to -karya (-かりゃ). For example: yokareba (良かれば if it's good) / yokarya (良かりゃ). For expressing conjecture about the state of something (-garu (-がる seeming to be) in standard Japanese), -sshasuru (しゃする) is used. For example, ureshigaru (嬉しがる he/she seems happy) becomes uresshasuru (嬉っしゃする). Lastly, -sa (-さ) may be added to the stem of i-adjectives to express exclamation. For example, umasaa! (美味さあ! it's so tasty!).

Like i-adjectives, na-adjectives often have ka attached in place of a copula for their plain and attributive forms. For example, genki da (元気だ, I'm well) becomes genki ka (元気か). Some na-adjectives may have na inserted in addition to ka, producing forms such as hen na ka (変なか, it’s strange) (equivalent to hen da (変だ)).

=== Bound auxiliaries ===
==== Copula and negative form ====
The Nagasaki dialect makes use of the copulas ja (じゃ) and ya (や). In practice, however, they rarely appear in these forms, appearing instead as conjugated versions. For example, the past tense (jatta (じゃった) and yatta (やった), both was) or hypothetical (jarou (じゃろう) and yarou (やろう) forms. There is also a marked disparity in usage of ja and ya between older and younger speakers, with older speakers preferring jatta and jarou and younger speakers tending towards yatta and yarou. In place of ja and ya, the sentence-ending particles bai (ばい) and tai (たい) are also commonly used as declaratives.

For the present tense negative (-nai (-ない)), n (ん) is attached to the -nai stem. For example, ikanai (行かない, don’t go) becomes ikan (行かん). Aside from the attachment of n, certain Ichidan verbs may be conjugated akin to Godan verbs, so that okinai (起きない do not go out) may not be conjugated in the Nagasaki dialect as okin (起きん) but as okiran (起きらん). For the past tense negative (-nakatta (-なかった)), -njatta (-んじゃった) or -nyatta (-んやった) is attached to the -nai stem. For example, ikanakatta (行かなかった, did not go) becomes ikanjatta (行かんじゃった) or ikanyatta (行かんやった). In Hirado and the Kitamatsu area, -jatta (-じゃった) is added to the -nai stem instead (E.g., ikajatta (行かじゃった)).

==== Progressive and perfective aspects ====
Like other Kyushu dialects, the Nagasaki dialect makes a distinction between the progressive and perfective aspects. Generally, -yoru (-よる) is used to express a progressive state whilst -toru (-とる) is used for completed actions. However, in some parts of the dialect area -choru (-ちょる) may be used in place of -toru, and in the Isahaya sub-dialect -oru (-おる) is sometimes used for the progressive aspect instead of -yoru. The table below shows how these auxiliaries attach to the Godan verb furu (降る, to rain, to fall).

| | Nagasaki dialect | Standard Japanese |
| Progressive aspect ‘It is raining’ | Furiyoru (降りよる); Furioru (降りおる) (Isahaya sub-dialect only) | Futteiru (降っている) |
| Perfective aspect ‘It has rained’ | Futtoru (降っとる); Fucchoru (降っちょる) (Some areas only) | Futteiru (降っている) |

==== Conjecture and hearsay ====
In addition to jarou and yarou, verbs and i-adjectives can also have their form changed to express conjecture in the Nagasaki dialect. For i-adjectives, -rou (-ろう) is attached to the plain form like in nakarou (無かろう, there probably is none) = nai darou (無いだろう). For verbs, -u (-う) is often attached to the -nai stem and palatalised, then dai (だい) is added to the end. For example, hareru darou (晴れるだろう, it will probably be sunny) becomes haryuu dai (晴りゅうだい). Around Nagasaki city, dai is not added, so that the form above is simply haryuu. When expressing conjecture regarding the state of something or its likeness (you da (ようだ to be like, to seem), the bound auxiliaries goto (ごと), gotoaru (ごとある) and gotaru (ごたる) are used. For expressing hearsay about something (sou (そう)), the bound auxiliary rashika (らしか) and the particle gena (げな) are used.

==== Potential ====
The Nagasaki dialect makes a distinction between so-called ‘ability potential’ (nouryoku kanou (能力可能)) and ‘situational potential’ (joukyou kanou (状況可能)). Ability potential refers to someone or something being able or unable to do something due to their internal ability. For example, a child cannot ride a bike because they are too small. In contrast, situational potential places the condition for potential to do something on an external locus. For example, a man cannot eat a fish because it has gone off. For ability potential, the bound auxiliaries -kiru (-きる) and yuru (-ゆる) are attached to the -masu stem of Godan verbs and some Nidan verbs, respectively. Whilst -yuru is widespread across Kyushu, -kiru is found exclusively in Nagasaki and Saga Prefectures. For situational potential, the bound auxiliaries -ruru (-るる) and -raruru (-らるる) are attached to the -nai stem of certain Nidan verbs. Exclusively in the dialect of Nagasaki city, -dasan (-ださん) may also be used to express inability (e.g., cannot) by attaching to the -masu stem of verbs. The example sentences below show uses of the potential bound auxiliaries mentioned above.

- Ability potential:
  - Mada chiisai node jitensha ni norenai (まだ小さいので自転車に乗れない, I can’t ride bikes yet because I’m too small)

→ Mada komoushite jitensha ni norikiran (まだこもうして自転車に乗りきらん).

- Situational potential:
  - Kono gohan wa kusatteiru kara taberarenai yo (このご飯は腐っているから食べられないよ, I can’t eat this, it’s gone off).

→ Kon mesha nemattokken kuwarenbai (こんめしゃ ねまっとっけん くわれんばい).

- Non-potential / inability (Nagasaki city only):
  - Machi e ikou to omotteita ga, isogashikute ikenakatta (町へ行こうと思っていたが、忙しくて行けなかった, I was thinking of going into town but I was too busy so I couldn’t).

→ Machi san ikouchi omoutotta batten isogashuushite ikidasanjatta (町さん行こうち思うとったばってん忙しゅうして行きださんじゃった).

==== Polite speech ====
The Nagasaki dialect makes use of various bound auxiliaries to express politeness, with some variation across the dialect area. Across most of Nagasaki, -naru (-なる) and -nasaru (-なさる) are attached to the -masu stem of verbs whilst -su (-す) and -ru (-る) are attached to the -nai stem of Godan verbs and the irregular verb suru (する). Meanwhile, -rasu (-らす) and -raru (-らる) are used for all other verb types. The city of Oomura and its surrounding area shares usage of the polite bound auxiliary -nasu (-なす) with the Kumamoto dialect, whilst two additional polite bound auxiliaries, -sharu (-しゃる) and -nsharu (-んしゃる), are commonly used in the Isahaya sub-dialect.

== Particles ==
=== Case-marking, adverbial, and binding particles ===
The Nagasaki dialect possesses a number of particles that are not found in standard Japanese, with many of them shared with other Hichiku dialects. The nominative case-marking particle (ga (が) in standard Japanese) is replaced by no (の) or n (ん), whilst to (と) is used in place of the explanatory and soft interrogative particle no (の). Furthermore, the accusative case-marking particle wo (を) is replaced by ba (ば). There are numerous particles used to indicate direction (ni (に)), including san (さん), shan (しゃん) and same (さめ). Ni itself is commonly abbreviated to i (い), which often merges with the preceding word. To describe the goal of an action (...するため, for the purpose of), the particle gya(a) (ぎゃ(あ)) is widely used. The particle kara (から) (not to be confused with kara (から, because / so)) is used to express a method or means of doing something (commonly de (で)). The adverbial particle wa (は), used to indicate a new topic, is changed to na (な) when following a nasal n (ん) sound. For example, hon wa (本は, the book is…) becomes hon’na (本な). The following sentences provide examples of the particles listed above in everyday conversation.

- Sensei ga irasshatta (先生がいらっしゃった, the teacher was there) → Sensei no korashita (先生のこらした)
- Hana no kirei na no wo katte kita yo (花のきれいなの買ってきたよ, I bought a pretty flower) → Hanan kireka to ba koute kita bai (花んきれかとばこうてきたばい)
- Kore wa dare no? (これは誰の?, whose is this?) → Koi dai n to? (こいだいんと?)
- Gakkou ni (学校に, to school) → Gakkei (がっけい)
- Mi ni iku (見に行く, go and see) → Mi gya iku (見ぎゃ行く)
- Basu de iku (バスで行く, go by bus) → Basu kara iku (バスから行く)

=== Conjunctive particles and related phrases ===
Across most of the Nagasaki dialect area, the reason-expressing resultative conjunctive particle kara (から, because, so) is replaced by ken (けん) or kee (けぇ). To express a greater degree of emphasis, the particles kenka (けんか) and kenga (けんが) may also be used. In the Northern sub-dialect, the Shimabara sub-dialect, as well as in the coastal parts of the Sonogi dialect area, sen (せん) or shen (しぇん) are also used. The phrases sori ken (そりけん) and soi ken (そいけん) are used as equivalents to sou da kara (そうだから because it’s like that).

The adversative resultative conjunctive particle keredomo (けれども, but, although) has a variety of equivalents in the Nagasaki dialect depending on area. Most common are the particles batten (ばってん), batte(e) (ばって(え)) and their more emphatic counterparts battenka (ばってんか) and battenga (ばってんが). In the Isahaya, Sonogi and northern Shimabara sub-dialects, don (どん) and jon (じょん) are also used. The phrases sojjon (そっじょん), soru batten (そるばってん), soi batten (そいばってん) and sogan batten (そがんばってん) are all used as equivalents to the phrase sou da kedo (そうだけど that may be true, but...).

There are a wide variety of particles used to express resultative hypotheticals (if X then Y) in the Nagasaki dialect, with usage depending on area. These particles are outlined below.

- Gi (ぎ), gin (ぎん) and ginta (ぎんた): spoken in and around Sasebo.
- Ginya (ぎんにゃ): spoken in the eastern part of the Sonogi sub-dialect area.
- Gitto (ぎっと): spoken in the Isahaya sub-dialect.
- Gira (ぎら): spoken in the northern part of the Shimabara Peninsula.
- Girya (ぎりゃ): spoken in the southern part of the Shimabara Peninsula.

In the Sonogi area, the conjunctive phrases aiba (あいば) and naiba (ないば) are commonly used as equivalents to the phrase sore nara (それなら if that is the case).

For adversative hypotheticals (-temo (-ても, even if)), the particles ten (てん) and taccha (たっちゃ) are used.

=== Sentence-ending and interjectory particles ===
The particles bai and tai are used in place of the copulas ja and ya, attaching directly to nouns. Bai is often used for affirming one's own subjective conclusions about something and also as a soft explanatory particle, whereas tai is used for self-evident, objectively true facts or situations. There are several variations of the standard bai and tai particles, including bana (ばな), ban (ばん) and baita (ばいた) for the former and taa (たぁ) and tan (たん) for the latter.

The particles i (い) and de(e) (で(ぇ)) are used following the volitional form of verbs to express an added element of emphasis or persuasion. E.g., ikou yo (行こうよ let’s go) becomes ikou i (行こうい) and yameyou yo (やめようよ let's stop) becomes yamyuu de (やみゅうで).

Like standard Japanese, the Nagasaki dialect makes frequent use of the sentence-ending particles na (な), no (の) and ne (ね), with ne used frequently by younger speakers. The interjectory particle sa (さ) is also commonly used. Among female speakers, the particles he (へ) and tohe (とへ) are also widely used.

In the eastern part of the Sonogi sub-dialect area, the sentence-ending particle zan (ざん) acts as an equivalent to all three of the sentence-ending particles zo (ぞ), yo (よ) and ne (ね). In the bay area of western Sonogi as well as in the Kitamatsu region, zai (ざい) is also used with the same meaning.

The particle nai (ない) is commonly used as an affirmative response marker in the Northern sub-dialect. Female speakers in the Nagasaki city area use haisaa (はいさぁ) with the same meaning as nai.

There are several regional variations of the interrogative case-marking particle ka (か). In the Isahaya area, kan (かん) is often heard, whilst kanashi (かなし) or kanaashi (かなぁし) is used in northern Shimabara and kanai (かない) is said in southern Shimabara.

The Isahaya area features several commonly used sentence-ending particles which are used to denote a degree of politeness. These are: nata (なた) or nataa (なたぁ), and nomai (のもい). Nata and nataa are derivations of the phrase naa anata (なぁあなた hey, you) and nomai is derived from the phrase naa omae (なぁお前 also hey, you).
