= Hakata dialect =

Japanese dialect of Fukuoka

Hakata Japanese
- Native to: Japan
- Region: Fukuoka
- Language family: Japonic: Japanese; Kyūshū Japanese; Hichiku; Chikuzen; Hakata Japanese

Language codes
- ISO 639-3: –
- Glottolog: haka1241
- IETF: ja-u-sd-jp40

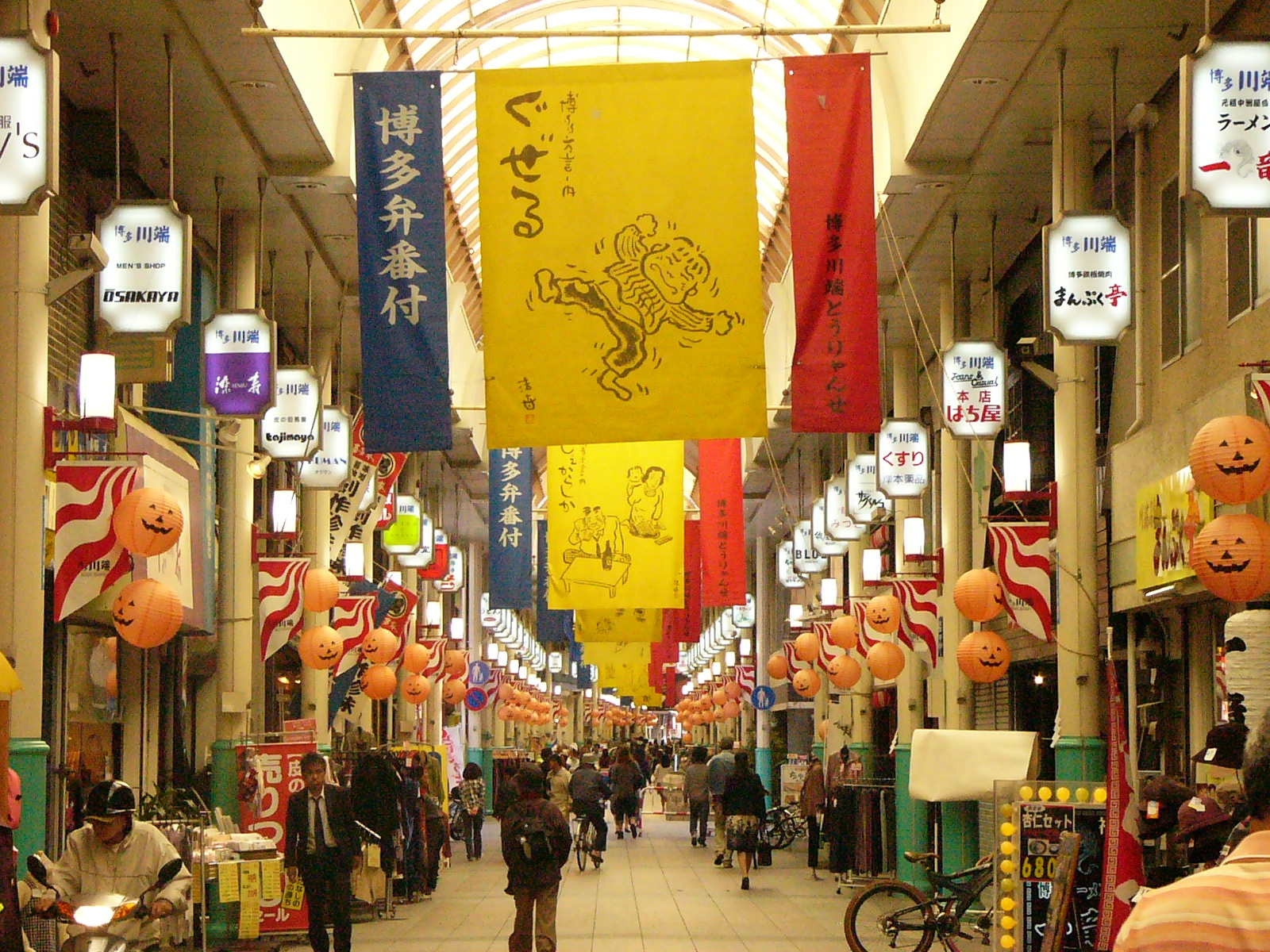
Banners in a shopping mall using Hakata dialect

Hakata dialect (博多弁, Hakata-ben) is a Japanese dialect spoken in Fukuoka city. Hakata dialect originated in Hakata commercial district, while a related Fukuoka dialect (福岡弁, Fukuoka-ben) was spoken in the central district. Hakata dialect has spread throughout the city and its suburbs. Most Japanese regard Hakata dialect as the dialect typical of Fukuoka Prefecture, so it is sometimes called Fukuoka-ben.

Hakata dialect is being increasingly spoken in television interviews in Fukuoka, where previously standard Japanese was expected.

Hakata-ben, a dialect of Kyushu with historically strong ties to Okinawa (Ryukyu), retains a rich vocabulary that appears to share roots with the Ryukyuan languages. One example is the Okinawan word フーチバー, which means "mugwort." In Hakata-ben, related terms such as フツ and フツッパ (literally "leaf of フツ") are used, suggesting a common linguistic origin.

== Grammar ==
The basic grammar of Hakata dialect is similar to other Hichiku dialects such as Saga dialect, Nagasaki dialect, and Kumamoto dialect. For example, Hakata dialect uses to or tto as a question, e.g., "What are you doing?", realized in standard Japanese as nani o shiteiru no?, is nan ba shiyo tto? or nan shitō to? in Hakata and other Hichiku dialects.

== Characteristics ==
Among the various distinctive features of Hakata-dialect, some representative expressions include:

- 〜どげん ("dogen") – meaning "how" or "what kind of"
- 〜っちゃん ("-cchan") – used to emphasize a statement, similar to "you know"
- 〜と？ ("-to?") – a sentence-ending particle indicating a question, similar to "is it?" or "are you?"
- 〜やけん ("-yaken") – meaning "because" or "therefore"
- 〜ばい ("-bai") – a sentence-ending particle meaning "it is" or used for emphasis
- 〜たい ("-tai") – another sentence-ending particle conveying affirmation, similar to "-bai"

In particular, among younger speakers, the usage of 〜ちゃん ("-chan") is often preferred instead of 〜たい for a softer expression.

In Hakata dialect, the "d" sound is replaced with "r".

=== Accent ===
When a verb is followed by the particle 「と」 (to), which corresponds to the standard Japanese particle 「の」 (no) used for questions (e.g., "Are you going home?"), the pitch tends to rise toward the end.

- 帰ると? ("Kaeru to?") – low-high-high-high
- 帰りよーと? ("Kaeriyō to?") – low-high-high-high-high-high

When two verbs are connected in an auxiliary relationship, only the first syllable of the first verb and the last syllable of the second verb are pronounced with a low pitch.

- 出てきた ("Detekita") – low-high-high-low
- 帰ってきた ("Kaettekita") – low-high-(variable)-high-high-low

In phrases where the particle 「の」 (no) attaches to a noun or a clause, the main word generally adopts a rising intonation.

- 雨のあがった ("Ame no agatta") – low-high-high-high-high-(variable)-low

When a verb stands alone or is concluded with the past or perfective marker 「た」 (ta), the final syllable must drop in pitch.

Examples:

- 見る ("Miru", to see) – high-low
- きく ("Kiku", to listen) – low-high → high-low
- かえる ("Kaeru", to return) – high-low-low
- あるく ("Aruku", to walk) – low-high-low
- さがす ("Sagasu", to search) – low-high-high → low-high-low
- きこえる ("Kikoeru", to be heard) – low-high-high-high → low-high-high-low

== Anime and Manga ==
Many Japanese anime and manga works feature characters who speak Kyushu dialects, including Hakata-dialect.

Anime:

- Namiuchigiwa no Muromi-san (波打ち際のむろみさん) – Muromi-san (むろみさん), Hii-chan (ひいちゃん)
- Rascal Does Not Dream (青春ブタ野郎はゆめみる少女の夢を見ない) – Koga Tomoe (古賀朋絵)
- Yatogame-chan Kansatsu Nikki (八十亀ちゃんかんさつにっき) – Nanbashi Toyone (難橋豊音)
- Grand Blue (ぐらんぶる) – Yoshihara Aina (吉原愛菜)
- SELECTION PROJECT – Tōma Mako (当麻まこ)
- Tamayomi (球詠) – Nakamura Nozomi (中村希)
- Saki: Achiga-hen episode of side-A (咲-Saki-阿知賀編 episode of side-A) – Shiramizuhira Satomi (白水哩), Tsuruta Himiko (鶴田姫子)
- Hakata Tonkotsu Ramens (博多豚骨ラーメンズ) – Baba Zenji (馬場善治)
- Haganai: I Don't Have Many Friends (僕は友達が少ない) – Hasegawa Kobato (羽瀬川小鳩) (Kumamoto dialect)
- Zombie Land Saga (ゾンビランドサガ) (Saga dialect)
- The Idolmaster: Shiny Colors (シャニマス) – Tsukioka Kogane (月岡恋鐘) (Sasebo dialect)
- Hakata-ben no Onnanoko wa Kawaii to Omoimasen ka? (博多弁の女の子はかわいいと思いませんか?) – Hakata-no Donko (博多乃どん子)
- Itoko no Ko (いとこのこ) (Kumamoto dialect)
- Ave Mujica: The Die is Cast – Yuutenji Nyamu (祐天寺 にゃむ)
