= Hichiku dialect =

Japanese dialects of western Kyūshū, Japan

Hichiku Japanese
- Native to: Japan
- Region: western Kyūshū
- Language family: Japonic: Japanese; Kyūshū; Hichiku Japanese

Language codes
- ISO 639-3: –
- Glottolog: hich1237
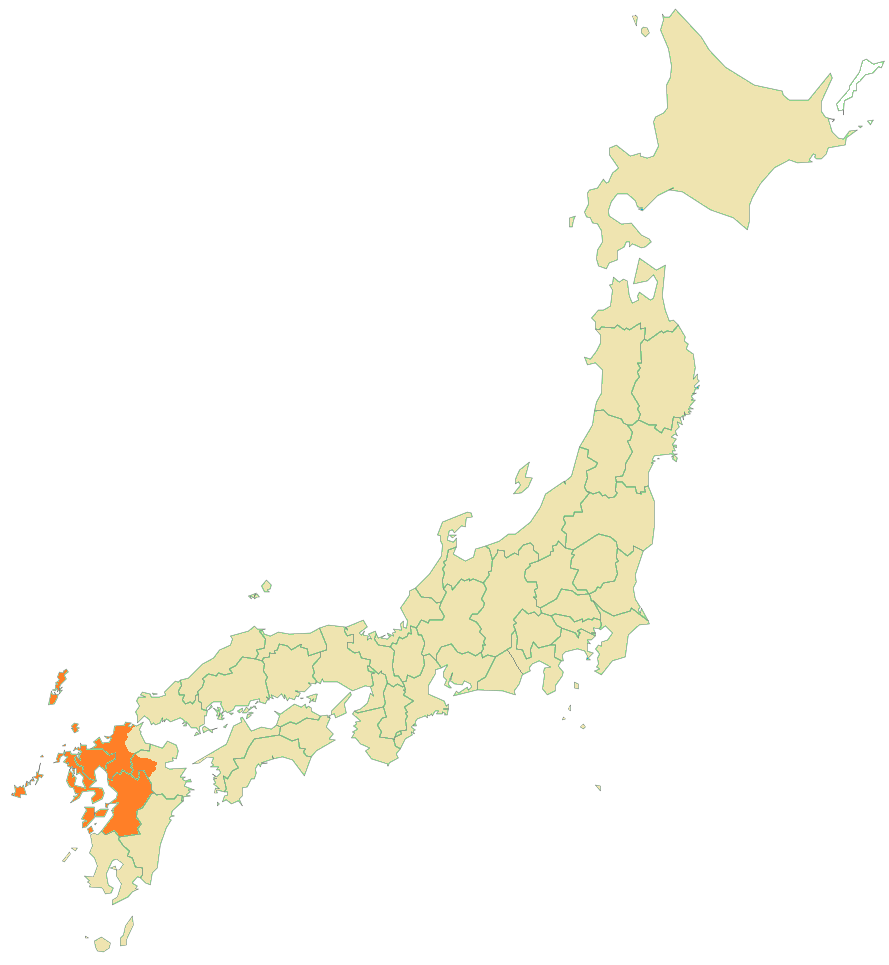
- Hichiku dialect area (orange)

The Hichiku dialect Hichiku hōgen (肥筑方言) is a group of the Japanese dialects spoken in western Kyushu. The name Hichiku (肥筑) is constructed by extracting a representative kanji from Hizen (肥前), Higo (肥後), Chikuzen (筑前) and Chikugo (筑後), the names of old provinces.

- Hichiku dialect
  - Chikuzen dialect (western Fukuoka Prefecture, formerly known as Chikuzen Province, includes the Hakata dialect of Hakata district in Fukuoka)
  - Chikugo dialect (southern Fukuoka Prefecture, formerly known as Chikugo Province)
    - Ōmuta dialect (Ōmuta)
    - Yanagawa dialect (Yanagawa)
  - Saga dialect (Saga Prefecture)
    - Karatsu dialect (northern Saga Prefecture centered Karatsu)
    - Tashiro dialect (easternmost Saga Prefecture centered Tashiro)
  - Nagasaki dialect (Nagasaki Prefecture)
    - Sasebo dialect (northern Nagasaki Prefecture centered Sasebo)
    - Hirado dialect (Hirado Island, west of Nagasaki Prefecture)
  - Kumamoto dialect (Kumamoto Prefecture)
  - Hita dialect (Hita, southwestern Oita Prefecture)
  - Iki dialect (Iki Island of Nagasaki Prefecture)
  - Tsushima dialect (Tsushima Island of Nagasaki Prefecture)
  - Gotō dialect (Gotō Islands of Nagasaki Prefecture)

Common characteristics of this group entail among others:

-adjectives ending in -ka instead of -i

-the ending -u or derivations instead of -ku

-copula -bai and -tai

-particle -to instead of -no

-palatized pronunciation of -se- as -she-
