= Yayoigaoka Station =

Railway station in Tosu, Saga Prefecture, Japan

JB 13 Yayoigaoka Station 弥生が丘駅
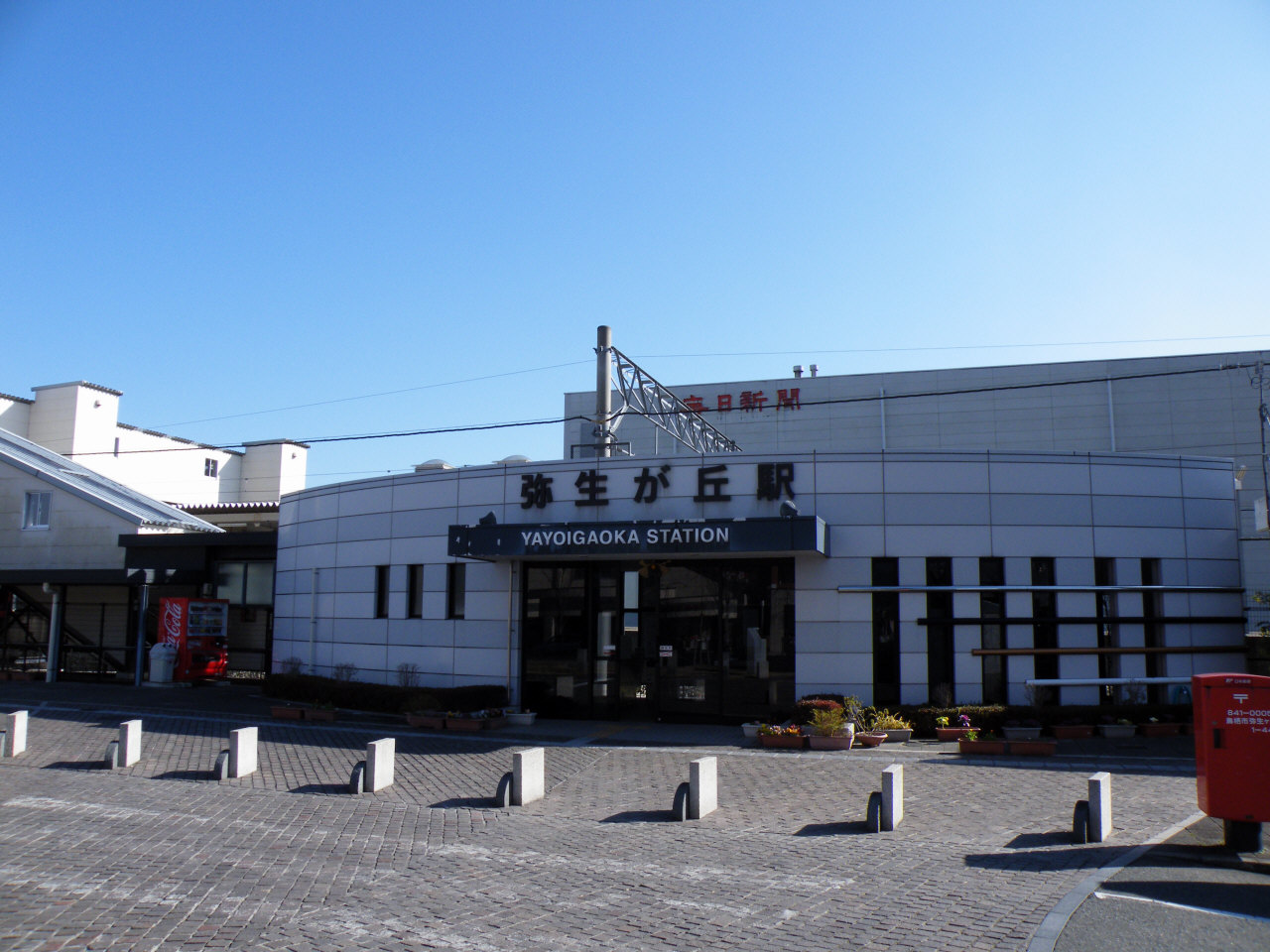

General information
- Location: 1 Chome Yayoigaoka, Tosu-shi, Saga-ken 841-0005; Japan
- Coordinates: 33°24′08″N 130°31′42″E
- Operator: JR Kyushu
- Line: JB Kagoshima Main Line
- Distance: 103.5 km from Mojikō
- Platforms: 2 island platforms
- Tracks: 4

Construction
- Structure type: At grade

Other information
- Status: Staffed
- Website: Official website

History
- Opened: 3 March 2001

Passengers
- FY2022: 1041 daily
- Rank: 128th (among JR Kyushu stations)

Services
Preceding station	JR Kyushu	Following station
Tashiro towards Kagoshima	Kagoshima Main Line	Kiyama towards Mojikō
Location
- Location within Saga Prefecture Location within Japan

Yayoigaoka Station (弥生が丘駅, Yayoigaoka-eki) is a passenger railway station located in the city of Tosu, Saga Prefecture, Japan. It is operated by JR Kyushu.

== Lines ==
The station is served by the Kagoshima Main Line and is located 103.5 km from the starting point of the line at Mojikō.

== Layout ==
The station consists of two island platforms serving four tracks, connected by an elevated station building. The station building is staffed.

=== Platforms ===
1	■ JB Kagoshima Main Line	for Kokura and Hakata
2	■ JB Kagoshima Main Line	for Kurume, Ōmuta

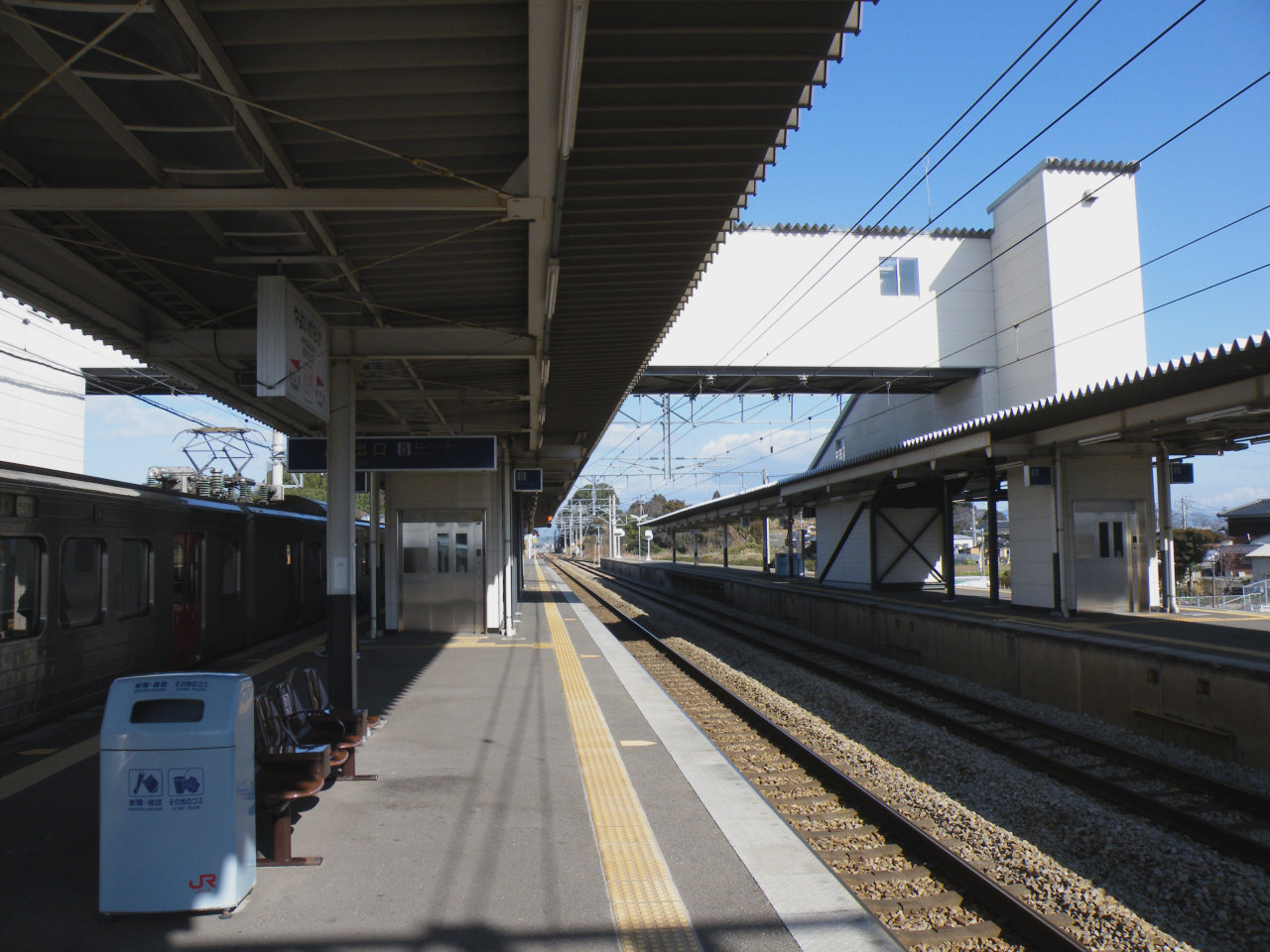
A view of the station platforms.

== History ==
The station was opened by JR Kyushu on 3 March 2001 as an added station on the existing Kagoshima Main Line track.

== Passenger statistics ==
In fiscal 2020, the station was used by an average of 1041 passengers daily (boarding passengers only), and it ranked 128th among the busiest stations of JR Kyushu.

== Surrounding area ==
- Tosu Junction (Kyūshū Expressway, Nagasaki Expressway and Ōita Expressway)
- Japan National Route 3
- Japan National Route 34
- Tosu Premium Outlets

== See also ==
- List of railway stations in Japan
