= Muromi-san =

Japanese manga series

- First tankōbon volume cover, featuring the titular character

波打際のむろみさん (Namiuchigiwa no Muromi-san)
- Genre: Comedy
- Manga
- Written by: Keiji Najima
- Published by: Kodansha
- Imprint: Shōnen Magazine Comics
- Magazine: Weekly Shōnen Magazine
- Original run: January 21, 2009 – May 28, 2014
- Volumes: 11 + 1 extra
- Anime television series
- Directed by: Tatsuya Yoshihara
- Written by: Kazuyuki Fudeyasu
- Music by: Osamu Tezuka
- Studio: Tatsunoko Production
- Licensed by: Crunchyroll
- Original network: Tokyo MX, MBS, TVK, TV Aichi, TVQ, BS11
- Original run: April 7, 2013 – June 30, 2013
- Episodes: 13 + 1 OAD
- icon

Muromi-san (波打際のむろみさん, Namiuchigiwa no Muromi-san; "Muromi on the Shore") is a Japanese manga series written and illustrated by Keiji Najima. It was serialized in Kodansha's shōnen manga magazine Weekly Shōnen Magazine from January 2009 to May 2014, with its chapters collected in eleven tankōbon volumes. A 13-episode anime television series adaptation produced by Tatsunoko Production was broadcast from April to June 2013.

== Plot ==
Takurō Mukōjima is a boy angler. He lands a ningyo (Japanese mermaid) by the name of Muromi-san and develops rapport with both her and her friends. The series title in English is Muromi-san and the Legendary Beasts. Muromi physically appears as a 16-year-old, however in reality, she is an ancient legendary creature. Muromi and her sisters are both guardians of the Earth and much older than they appear. "Takkun", as Muromi calls him, is a high school student who does not have a lot of motivation or care for all the attention Muromi gives him, yet he still ends up getting involved in Muromi's adventures. There are a number of legendary monsters Takkun meets and almost gets eaten by during their adventures.

== Characters ==
Muromi-san (むろみさん)
Voiced by: Yukari Tamura
A cheerful mermaid who speaks Hakata dialect. She often goes ashore and enjoys human culture. Somehow she feels kindly toward Takurō.
Takurō Mukōjima (向島 拓朗, Mukōjima Takurō)
Voiced by: Takahiro Mizushima
A high school student who likes fishing. He has a cool head and does not panic even when he faced strange creatures. He is called Takkun by Muromi.
Hii-chan (ひぃちゃん)
Voiced by: Ai Nonaka
An innocent mermaid who also speaks Hakata dialect. She calls Muromi "sis (おねえたん, onee-tan)." Loves animals, and is good friends especially with dolphins.
Sumida-san (隅田さん)
Voiced by: Sumire Uesaka
Muromi's drinking companion mermaid with a ponytail. She is often unlucky in love and drinks in desperation.
Fuji-san (富士さん)
Voiced by: Hitomi Harada
A high-handed mermaid who has huge breasts. Later, she awakes to love for Muromi, although Muromi does not feel the same way, and later becomes a masochist.
Levia-san (リヴァイアさん, Rivaia-san)
Voiced by: Mai Nakahara
Muromi's senpai mermaid who speaks Kokura dialect. She was once a fierce monster, but was reformed by Muromi and is generous now.
Yeti (イエティ, Ieti)
Voiced by: Chiwa Saito
A cryptid in Himalayas. Unlike the general reputation, it is cute, quiet and diligent. It is shy, but is friends with Muromi. It hates being pulled by its ears.
Harpy (ハーピー, hāpī)
Voiced by: Kanako Sakai
A bird-girl who lives with and takes on Yeti and often pounces on mermaids. She also has a very short memory, forgetting everything important after walking three steps.
Otohime (乙姫, Otohime)
Voiced by: Saki Fujita
An owner of the Ryūgū-jō, a legendary undersea palace. However, the Ryugu-jo went bankrupt and she is reduced to a part-time worker in human world now.
Kawabata (川端, Kawabata)
Voiced by: Kenji Hamada
A Kappa friend of Muromi. Like other kappa, he is skilled in medicine and raising cucumbers. He dislikes humans because they killed his older brother (his mummy is the one in the Zuiryū-ji temple in Osaka) but takes a liking to Takurō.

== Media ==
=== Manga ===
Written and illustrated by Keiji Najima, Muromi-san was first published as a short-term intensive serialization in Kodansha's shōnen manga magazine Weekly Shōnen Magazine from January 21 to February 18, 2009; it was later developed into a full series starting on July 15, 2009, and finished on May 28, 2014. Kodansha collected its chapters in eleven tankōbon volumes, released from February 17, 2010, to July 17, 2014.

Najima posted a series of "Hometown Edition" (地元版, Jimoto-ban) chapters on Twitter from September 1, 2019, to August 8, 2020; they were collected in a single volume released on December 17 of the same year, and a special eight-page one-shot chapter was published in Weekly Shōnen Magazine on the same day.

==== Volumes ====
No.	Release date	ISBN
1	February 17, 2010	978-4-06-384258-6
2	June 17, 2010	978-4-06-384318-7
3	January 17, 2011	978-4-06-384433-7
4	July 15, 2011	978-4-06-384524-2
5	December 16, 2011	978-4-06-384605-8
6	April 17, 2012	978-4-06-384658-4
7	October 17, 2012	978-4-06-384741-3
8	March 15, 2013	978-4-06-384829-8
9	August 16, 2013	978-4-06-394915-5
10	February 17, 2014	978-4-06-395012-0
11	July 17, 2014	978-4-06-395127-1
Extra	December 17, 2020	978-4-06-521632-3

=== Anime ===
A 13-episode anime television series, produced by Tatsunoko Production, directed by Tatsuya Yoshihara and written by Kazuyuki Fudeyasu, was broadcast on Tokyo MX, MBS, TVK, TV Aichi, TVQ and BS11 from April 7 to June 30, 2013. (Note: Tokyo MX listed the air dates for the series on Saturday at 25:15, which is effectively Sunday at 1:15 a.m. JST.) The opening theme song is "Nanatsu no Umi yori Kimi no Umi" (七つの海よりキミの海) by Sumire Uesaka. An original animation DVD (OAD) was bundled with the limited edition of the manga's ninth volume, released on August 16, 2013.

The series was streamed by Crunchyroll.

==== Episodes ====
No.	Title	Original release date
1	"Muromi-san on the Brink" "Setogiwa no Muromi-san" (瀬戸際のむろみさん)	April 7, 2013
Takuro Mukojima is outside fishing when he reels up a girl who introduces herself as Muromi-san, a mermaid.
2	"Muromi-san and the Legendary Sea Creatures" "Densetsu no Kaijū to Muromi-san" (伝説の海獣とむろみさん)	April 14, 2013
Muromi-san gives Takuro her cellphone number and is upset when he doesn't send any messages despite her sending him hundreds. Later, Takuro fishes up another mermaid who introduces herself as Levia-san (Leviathan), a giant sea monster from the Old Testament.
3	"Muromi-san and Old Memories" "Sekinen no Omoi to Muromi-san" (積年の想いとむろみさん)	April 21, 2013
Levia-san, Hii-chan, and Sumida-san try to get Muromi-san to get over her hatred of marine mammals. She hates them because she had a boyfriend in the Mesozoic era who had developed lungs, but decided to stay in the ocean anyway. She thinks whales and dolphins are his descendants. Levia-san tells Muromi-san that the toothed whales returned to sea after having evolved into complete land mammals, which means her ex-boyfriend either evolved into something else or became extinct.
4	"Muromi-san and the Food Chain" "Shokumotsurensa to Muromi-san" (食物連鎖とむろみさん)	April 28, 2013
Muromi-san introduces Takuro to her friend Yeti, who is in Japan for autumn sightseeing. Later, back in the mountains, Yeti forges a sword, and then comes across a trapped Harpy. Yeti frees Harpy and they all meet at Takuro's fishing spot, where everyone tries to break Harpy's habit of attacking Muromi-san.
5	"Muromi-san and Twin Mountain" "Tsuin Maunten to Muromi-san" (ツインマウンテンとむろみさん)	May 5, 2013
6	"Muromi-san and Ryuuguujou" "Ryūgūjō to Muromi-san" (竜宮城とむろみさん)	May 12, 2013
7	"The Boy, Kappa, and Muromi-san" "Shōnen to Kappa to Muromi-san" (少年と河童とむろみさん)	May 19, 2013
8	"Muromi-san and the Nice(?) Type" "Iyashikei(?) to Muromi-san" (癒し系(?)とむろみさん)	May 26, 2013
9	"Muromi-san and the Secret Advanced Civilization" "Himitsu no Chō Bunmei to Muromi-san" (ひみつの超文明とむろみさん)	June 2, 2013
10	"Muromi-san Worldwide" "Wārudo Waido no Muromi-san" (ワールドワイドのむろみさん)	June 9, 2013
11	"Muromi-san and the Chill" "Tsun to Muromi-san" (ツンとむろみさん)	June 16, 2013
12	"Muromi-san and Different Forms of Love" "Iron'na Ai no Katachi to Muromi-san" (色んな愛の形とむろみさん)	June 23, 2013
13	"The Years Go By Muromi-san" "Yukutoshi Kurutoshi no Muromi-san" (行く年来る年のむろみさん)	June 30, 2013
Muromi-san and her friends celebrates the new year.
