= Japanese irregular verbs =

Exceptions to Japanese verb conjugation rules

Japanese verb conjugation is very regular, as is usual for an agglutinative language, but there are a number of exceptions. The best-known irregular verbs (不規則動詞, fukisoku dōshi) are the common verbs する suru "do" and 来る kuru "come", sometimes categorized as the two Group 3 verbs. As these are the only verbs frequently flagged as significantly irregular, they are sometimes misunderstood to be the only irregular verbs in Japanese. However, there are about a dozen irregular verbs in Japanese, depending on how one counts. The other irregular verbs encountered at the beginning level are ある aru "be (inanimate)" and 行く iku/yuku "go", with the copula behaving similarly to an irregular verb.

There are also a few irregular adjectives, of which the most common and significant is 良い yoi "good".

== Terminology ==
The word "irregular" is tentatively used to translate the Japanese word henkaku (変格). There are four types of "irregular inflection" (変格活用, henkaku katsuyō):

- sa-gyō henkaku katsuyō (サ行変格活用), abbreviated sa-hen (サ変). This type applies to the modern verb suru (する), its classical equivalent su (す), and all their derived compounds, such as aisuru (愛する), hassuru (発する), kanzuru (感ずる), and benkyō suru (勉強する). Sa-gyō (サ行) refers to a group of kana in the gojūon table that are headed by sa (さ) and all contain the consonant /s/. English translations include "s-irregular" ("s-irr") and simply "sa-hen".
- ka-gyō henkaku katsuyō (カ行変格活用), abbreviated ka-hen (カ変). This type applies to the modern verb kuru (来る) and its classical equivalent ku (来). Ka-gyō (カ行) refers to a group of kana in the gojūon table that are headed by ka (か) and all contain the consonant /k/. English translations include "k-irregular" ("k-irr") and simply "ka-hen".
- na-gyō henkaku katsuyō (ナ行変格活用), abbreviated na-hen (ナ変). This type applies to the classical verbs sinu (死ぬ) (which evolved into the "regular" modern godan verb shinu) and inu (往ぬ). Na-gyō (ナ行) refers to a group of kana in the gojūon table that are headed by na (な) and all contain the consonant /n/. English translations include "n-irregular" ("n-irr") and simply "na-hen".
- ra-gyō henkaku katsuyō (ラ行変格活用), abbreviated ra-hen (ラ変). This type applies to the classical verbs ari (あり) (which evolved into the "regular" modern godan verb aru), imasugari (いますがり), wori (居り) (modern oru) and faberi (侍り) (modern haberu). Ra-gyō (ラ行) refers to a group of kana in the gojūon table that are headed by ra (ら) and all contain the consonant /ɾ/. English translations include "r-irregular" ("r-irr") and simply "ra-hen".

"Irregular verbs", or actually, henkaku verbs, are a minor group of verbs that do not conform to the inflectional patterns of major "regular" godan and ichidan verbs. This does not necessarily mean that all "regular" verbs are uniformly regular, nor that all "irregular" verbs of one of the classes above are equally irregular. For instance, the verb iku (行く) belongs to the "regular" godan class, yet when combining with the auxiliary ta (た) or the particle te (て), it exhibits irregularity compared to the rest of its own class. Likewise, the "regular" godan verbs tou (問う) and kou (請う) are just as irregular. Meanwhile, some "irregular" sa-hen verbs such as aisu(ru) (愛す（る）) and kanzu(ru) (感ず（る）) have assumed many inflectional forms typical of the "regular" godan and ichidan classes, respectively, making them increasingly "regular", yet irregular to their own "irregular" prototype, su(ru) (す（る）).

Historically, s-irregular and k-irregular verbs were sometimes known as sandan (三段), given that their forms contain three out of the five vowels of Japanese.

== suru and kuru ==
Revision sheet including most irregular conjugations of suru and kuru

The most significant irregular verbs are the verbs する suru "to do" and 来る kuru "to come", which are both very common and quite irregular. Often the conjugations behave as if they were instead the verb しる or す, or respectively きる or こる, where (other than す) these are ichidan verb (Group 2 verbs, ru verbs) conjugation (there are no -oru ichidan verbs, though 来る sometimes behaves as if it were one), but beyond there are further exceptions. Historically する came from earlier す, which explains some of the irregularity. The following table is ordered to emphasize the regularities.

form	する suru	来る kuru	notes
-masu stem	し shi	来 ki	しる and きる
-te form	して shite	来て kite	しる and きる
-ta form	した shita	来た kita	しる and きる
-nai form	しない shinai	来ない konai	しる and こる
-nai stem	せ se	来 ko	irregular and こる
Volitional	しよう shiyō	来よう koyō	しる and こる
Passive	される sareru	来られる korareru	す and こる
Causative	させる saseru	来させる kosaseru	す and こる
Potential	できる dekiru	来られる korareru, 来れる koreru	suppletive and こる
Imperative	しろ shiro, せよ seyo	来い koi	しる、す and irregular
Conditional	すれば sureba	来れば kureba	regular

The irregular 〜ない -nai stem of する is often overlooked; it is used in grammatical forms where the 〜ない form is used without the 〜ない – generally formal – as in 食べず tabe-zu "without eating" or 食べんがため tabe-n ga tame "for the purpose of eating". In these contexts する becomes せ, as in せず se-zu "without doing" or せんがため se-n ga tame "for the purpose of doing". Note the similarity to 〜ません as the negative form of 〜ます, of the same origin.

The potential 来れる koreru form is from the omission of ra in the られる rareru potential form, and is found in all Group 2 verbs; it is considered an error by prescriptive grammarians, but is increasingly common, particularly in spoken speech and in younger Japanese.

== Basic grammar ==
The copula だ and です (polite), together with the verb ある aru "be (inanimate)", which is used grammatically, and the 〜ます suffix, which functions similarly to an irregular auxiliary verb, are all irregular to varying degrees, and particularly used in polite speech. It is debatable whether they should be classified as verbs or as different parts of speech.

Formally, the copula is である de aru. This form is normal in writing, but in spoken Japanese it is almost universally contracted to だ da, or in some dialects じゃ ja or や ya. When conjugated politely, である de aru becomes であります de arimasu following the regular transformation. This form is normal in writing, except that most writing either uses plain conjugations or the honorific forms, so in fact this form is not commonly seen. In spoken Japanese, であります de arimasu is universally contracted to です desu.

form	affirmative plain	affirmative polite	affirmative honorific	negative plain	negative polite	negative honorific
non-past	だ da である de aru* じゃ ja**	です desu であります de arimasu*	でございます de gozaimasu	じゃない ja nai ではない dewa nai*	じゃないです ja nai desu じゃありません ja arimasen ではありません dewa arimasen*	でございません de gozaimasen
past	だった datta であった de atta*	でした deshita でありました de arimashita*	でございました de gozaimashita	じゃなかった ja nakatta ではなかった dewa nakatta*	じゃなかったです ja nakatta desu じゃありませんでした ja arimasendeshita ではありませんでした dewa arimasendeshita*	でございませんでした de gozaimasendeshita
-te form	で de	で de であって de atte*	で de であって de atte*	じゃなくて ja nakute ではなくて dewa nakute*	じゃなくて ja nakute ではなくて dewa nakute*	ではなくて dewa nakute

(*) indicates literary forms

(**) じゃ ja is a dialectal spoken form of だ da

== Polite verbs ==
These five special polite verbs have the slight irregularity that 〜る -ru changes to 〜い -i in the -masu stem (continuative form, 連用形) and imperative stem (命令形), as opposed to the expected ×〜り *-ri and ×〜れ *-re. As these all end in -aru, these can be termed "aru special class". The most commonly encountered of these is 〜ください, used for polite requests.

base form	-masu form
いらっしゃる	いらっしゃいます
おっしゃる	おっしゃいます
くださる	くださいます
ござる	ございます
なさる	なさいます

== Euphony ==
A few short verbs have irregular euphonic form (音便形) in 〜て/〜た -te/-ta form, most significantly 行く iku "go":

- 行く iku conjugates to 行って itte and 行った itta, not ×いいて *iite or いいた *iita
- 問う・訪う tou "ask; visit, call on" conjugates to 問うて・訪うて toute, not *totte
- 請う・乞う kou "request; beg" conjugates to 請うて・乞うて koute, not *kotte
- 恋う kou "miss, yearn, pine" conjugates to 恋うて koute, not *kotte

These latter euphonic changes – -owit- → -owt- → -out- (→ -ōt-) – are regular in -te/-ta form in Kansai dialect, e.g., しまった shimatta "done it; darn" → しもうた shimōta, but only occur in the above exceptions in standard Japanese.

Euphonic change also results in some conjugations being uniform across the language, but irregular compared with other verbs. Most significantly, the た ta and て te forms (perfective and participle/gerundive) of godan verbs all exhibit euphonic sound change, except for す su verbs.

The volitional form, as in 読もう yomō and 食べよう tabeyō, does not correspond to a verb stem ending in -o but is actually formed from the irrealis -a stem, with a euphonic change of a to o – for example yomu > yoma-u > yomou = yomō. Thus the apparent volitional "stem" is not seen in other contexts.

== Single kanji suru ==
While pronunciation remains unchanged when two-kanji compounds are denominalized by 〜する suru verbs, pronunciation or conjugations may be irregular in the cases where single-kanji suru verbs behave as new independent words.

For example, these single-kanji words exhibit various pronunciation changes (where two-kanji suru verbs would not):

- 愛する ai-suru – no sound change
- 達する tas-suru – gemination (促音) from たつ+する tatsu+suru to たっする tas-suru
- 禁ずる kin-zuru – voicing (連濁 rendaku) from きん+する kin+suru to きんずる kin-zuru
- 禁じる kin-jiru – -zuru verbs have an associated -jiru form, which is the more common form in modern Japanese

Additionally, the 〜る can be dropped accordingly (except for the 〜じる forms):

- 愛す ai-su
- 達す tas-su
- 禁ず kin-zu

These する／す／ず forms may be conjugated in various ways, particularly in less common forms. One notable example is 愛する ai-suru (often conjugated as 愛す ai-su) where the potential form is 愛せる ai-seru rather than 愛できる ai-dekiru, and the negative form is 愛さない ai-sanai rather than 愛しない ai-shinai. While irregular compared to the -suru conjugation scheme, 愛す ai-su and other -su verbs are actually conjugated as regular Godan (Group 1) verbs. Similarly, the -jiru verbs mentioned above are conjugated as regular Ichidan (Group 2) verbs.

Some single-kanji する verbs have irregular passive conjugations which stem from classical Japanese.

For example:

- 罰する becomes 罰せられる not 罰される
- 発する becomes 発せられる not 発される

== Alternative roots ==
For a few verbs, the root of the verb changes depending on context. Most significantly, these are:

- 〜得る -uru – auxiliary verb to indicate possibility, the u changes to e in the negative and polite forms, yielding 〜得る 〜うる -uru "... possible", 〜得ない 〜えない -enai "...impossible", and 〜得ます 〜えます -emasu "... possible (polite)". This is often written in kana, and is most familiar from ありうる ariuru "be possible" and ありえない arienai "be impossible".
- 行く iku, yuku "go" – some dialectal differences, but generally iku by itself and -yuki when used as a suffix, e.g., for train destinations.
  There is some dialectal difference here as well, with iku as more standard, but yuku common in Western Japan (as well as song lyrics). By contrast, 言う iu, yuu "say" is only a dialectal difference, with standard iu, but Western Japanese yuu.

== Regular but unusual ==
Some verbs follow rules that are regular (in terms of the overall language), but relatively unusual or special. While not irregular by itself, they present many of the same difficulties.

=== Irrealis form of u verbs ===
Verbs ending in う -u have the unusual irrealis ending -wa, as in 買わない ka-wa-nai, from 買う ka-u. This is due to these traditionally having a w, but the [w] being lost except as わ wa (and in を (w)o following an ん n).

=== iru and eru verbs ===
Most Japanese verbs are godan verbs (五段動詞, godan-dōshi; literally: "Class-5 verbs", aka: Group 1 verbs, u‑verbs), though there are also the ichidan verbs (一段動詞, ichidan-dōshi; literally: "Class-1 verbs", aka: Group 2 verbs, ru‑verbs). All ichidan verbs end in -iru or -eru, but not all verbs ending in -iru or -eru are ichidan verbs – instead, some are godan verbs. Thus the conjugation type of a verb ending in -iru or -eru cannot be determined naively from the dictionary form.

There are many such verbs with common examples being 知る shiru "know", 走る hashiru "run", 入る hairu "enter", and 帰る kaeru "return".

There are also homophone verbs that could be either godan or ichidan verbs; for example, 生きる ikiru "live, stay alive" and 寝る neru "sleep" are ichidan verbs, but 熱る ikiru "become sultry" and 練る neru "temper, refine, knead" are godan verbs.

=== nu verbs ===
死ぬ shinu (to die) is the only ぬ -nu verb, and thus its conjugations are less familiar, but it is otherwise regular. There used to be other ぬ -nu verbs, notably 往ぬ／去ぬ いぬ inu "leave".

== Compound verbs ==
Japanese compound verbs are generally constructed using the masu stem form of the primary verb, as in 読み始める yomi-hajimeru "begin to read". In some cases compound verbs do not follow this pattern, generally due to sound change. Such exceptions include 振る舞う furu-mau "behave, conduct; treat (to food or drink)", from 振るう furuu + 舞う mau, instead of the regular ×振るい舞う *furui-mau.

== Abbreviations ==
There are various abbreviations in Japanese, primarily of nouns or of inflections, such as 〜ている to 〜てる or 〜ておく to 〜とく, or even 〜ているの to 〜てん, though verb roots only rarely change. One such example is in the verb いらっしゃる, which has the following abbreviated forms:

- いらっしゃって to いらして
- いらっしゃった to いらした

== Miscellaneous ==
The imperative form of the auxiliary verb 〜くれる -kureru is 〜くれ -kure, rather than the expected ×くれろ *kurero.

== Adjectives ==
Japanese adjectives, specifically i-adjectives, function grammatically as verbs, though with more limited conjugation. There are a few irregularities of note. Most significantly, 良い yoi "good" is generally replaced by ii in the base form (yoi is found in formal usage), though only yoi is used in conjugated forms such as 良く yoku and 良くない yokunai.

There are more minor and subtler irregularities in certain constructions, particularly in adjectives with single-mora roots. In the -me form, adjectives can replace the -i with a 〜め -me (in kanji 〜目) to indicate "somewhat", as in 薄め usu-me "somewhat watery, weak" from 薄い usu-i "watery, weak". However, in some cases the -i is not dropped, notably 濃いめ ko-i-me "somewhat strong (tea etc.)", from 濃い ko-i.

In the -sugiru form, verbs and adjective attach a 〜すぎる -sugiru (in kanji 〜過ぎる) to the stem to indicate "excessive" – for example 近すぎる chika-sugiru "too close", from 近い chika-i "close" – but in the case of a 〜ない -na-i negative ending (and standalone ない nai), there is sometimes an intrusive 〜さ -sa, yielding 〜なさすぎる (standalone なさすぎる na-sa-sugiru) instead of the expected 〜なすぎる -na-sugiru. Typically this is optional, and generally omitted, as in 忙しな（さ）すぎる sewashina(-sa)-sugiru "too restless", but for single-mora stems it is generally included, as in なさすぎる na-sa-sugiru "not too much", instead of marginal △なすぎる ?na-sugiru. There is considerable variation and uncertainty by native speakers, as these forms are uncommon. Further, this is confusingly similar to the intrusive 〜さ -sa when an adjective is followed by 〜そうだ -sō da "appears, seems", so 良さそうだ yo-sa-sō da "seems good" and 無さそうだ na-sa-sō da "seems not", but 良すぎる yo-sugiru "too good" and 無さすぎる na-sa-sugiru "too not, too absent".

静けさ shizu-ke-sa "tranquility" is not an irregular derivation of 静か shizu-ka "quiet, still" – the regular derivation 静かさ shizu-ka-sa "quietness, stillness" exists and is used – but is rather a separate word of distinct etymology – in Old Japanese the root words were 静けし shizu-ke-shi and 静かなり shizu-ka-nari, to which the 〜さ -sa was separately affixed.

== History ==
Some irregular verbs date at least to Old Japanese, notably する、来る、ある、死ぬ. The other ぬ verb いぬ also dates to Old Japanese, though is now no longer used, and 居る iru "be (animate)" was formerly をる woru and irregular, though it is now regular.

- Old Japanese#Irregular verbs
- Early Middle Japanese#Verbs
