= Chikuzen dialect =

Japanese dialect spoken in western Fukuoka prefecture

- 筑前方言
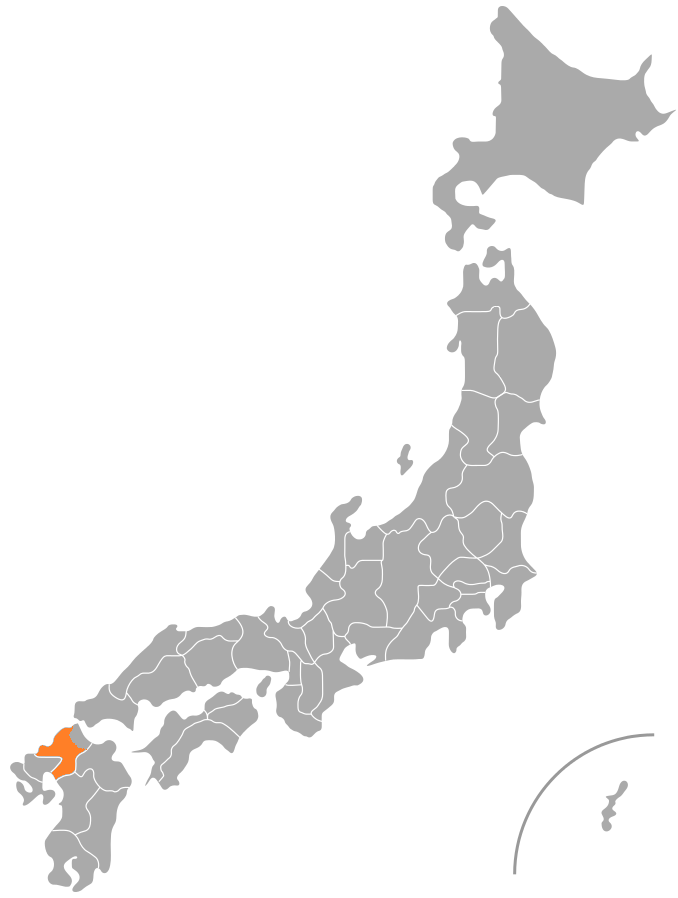
- Chikuzen dialect area (orange).
- Native to: Japan
- Region: Western Fukuoka Prefecture, Kyushu
- Language family: Japonic: Japanese; Kyushu; Hichiku; Chikuzen dialect

Language codes
- ISO 639-3: –

The Chikuzen dialect (Japanese: 筑前方言 chikuzen hogen) is a dialect, or dialect group of Japanese spoken in western Fukuoka Prefecture, Kyushu. It includes the Hakata, Fukuoka and Munakata dialects.

== Classification ==
The Chikuzen dialect is a Kyushu dialect. It is officially part of the Hichiku subgroup, which is spoken across western Kyushu. However, speakers in some areas confusingly share more spoken similarities with neighbouring dialects. For example, the Chikuzen dialect spoken in the east of the dialect area is more similar to the Buzen dialect. Likewise, speakers in the south have a stronger spoken resemblance to speakers of the Chikugo dialect.

== Phonology ==
The perfective aspect, commonly -yoru (-よる) in West Japanese and Kyushu dialects, is often said as -you (-よう) in the Chikuzen dialect. For example, ikiyoru (行きよる, I am here) becomes ikiyou (行きよう). Similarly, the progressive aspect, -toru (-とる), becomes -tou (-とう). E.g. ittoru (行っとる, I am going) becomes ittoo (行っとう). The sounds se (せ) and ze (ぜ) are pronounced as she (しぇ) and je (じぇ), whilst among western dialect speakers, the sounds da (だ), de (で) and do (ど) change to ra (ら), re (れ) and ro (ろ), respectively. For example, tetsudou (鉄道, railway) becomes tetsurou and sudare (簾, sushi mat) becomes surare. In the southwest of the dialect area, ri (り) is sometimes pronounced as dzi (ぢ).

=== Pitch accent ===
The Chikuzen dialect possesses a variation of the Tokyo-standard pitch accent. There are notable changes to the pitch accent of two-mora nouns (e.g., sora (空, sky)) across Chikuzen, with the specific changes depending on region. Across most of the Chikuzen dialect area, two-mora nouns with a wide vowel (aka. a (あ), e (え), o (お)) as their first mora and a narrow vowel (aka. i (い), u (う)) as their second mora become front-mora stressed. In certain areas, including Hakata Ward in Fukuoka City and the district of Kasuya, two-mora nouns may be front-mora stressed when only a narrow vowel is present at the second mora. Two-mora nouns without these particular attributes are stressed on their final mora (as opposed to flat in standard Japanese). There is also a tendency, particularly among the younger generation, to stress words differently when they appear within a sentence as opposed to in isolation. Most notably, the question-marking particle to (と) causes the entire preceding sentence to become flat and possess a higher intonation. In contrast, in the southern parts of the dialect area, where there is greater proximity to the Chikugo region, differentiating between words’ different pitch accents becomes murkier, with traits of non-accent being found. The table below shows some differences and similarities in pitch accent between Fukuoka City, Oita Prefecture, the Buzen region and Tokyo for two-mora nouns with the nominative case-making particle ga (が) attached.

Pitch accent of two-mora nouns
Example word	Fukuoka	Oita・Buzen	Tokyo
niwa (庭, garden)	niwa ga	niwa ga	
tori (鳥, bird)	tori ga	tori ga	tori ga
kawa (川, river)	kawa ga	kawa ga	kawa ga
ishi (石, stone)	ishi ga	ishi ga	ishi ga
inu (犬, dog)	inu ga		
kasa (笠, hat)	kasa ga		

== Grammar ==
=== Conjugation of verbs and i-adjectives ===
The dialect retains Nidan conjugation for certain verbs as well as irregular conjugation of n-ending verbs. For example, the plain form of the n-ending verb shinu (死ぬ, to die) becomes shinuru (死ぬる). Ichidan and Nidan verbs are often conjugated in a fashion identical to that of r-ending Godan verbs. This is especially true for the imperative form, which changes from the typical -ro (-ろ) ending to -re (-れ). E.g., okiro (起きろ, wake up) becomes okire (起きれ). A softer imperative form that derives from the -masu (-ます) stem, e.g., kakii (書きい) and taberii (食べりい), is also used. Like other Kyushu dialects, the -masu (-ます) stem of certain Godan verbs experiences euphony (change). Namely, those ending in -su (-す) - which become i- (い-) as opposed to shi- (し-) - and those ending in -u (-う), -mu (-む) and -bu (-ぶ) – all of which become u- (う-) as opposed to i- (い-), mi- (み-) and bi- (び-), respectively.

There are several notable differences in i-adjective conjugation between the Chikuzen dialect and standard Japanese. The plain and attributive form ending, usually -i (-い), becomes -ka (-か) in the western and southern parts of the dialect area. For example, hayai (早い early) is said as hayaka (早か). In the eastern part of the Chikuzen region, the standard i-ending is used, save for in yoi (良い, good), which is said yoka (よか). The conjunctive form loses its ku- (く-) to simply become u- (う-), like in younaka (ようなか) (yokunai (良くない, is not good) and ureshuunaru (うれしゅうなる) (ureshikunaru (嬉しくなる, to become happy) [18]. The continuative form (-kute (-くて, …and…)) can be either -ute (-うて) or -ushite (-うして). For example, youte (ようて) and youshite (ようして) (both yokute (良くて, good and…). In the western and southern parts of the dialect area, -sa (-さ) is attached to the adjective stem to express exclamation.

=== Bound auxiliaries ===
==== Copula and negative form ====
Variations of ja (じゃ) and ya (や) are used as copulas in the Chikuzen dialect. Historically, ja was used exclusively, whilst ya later proliferated due to usage by younger speakers. The various copulas include jan (じゃん), yan (やん), yaga (やが), bai (ばい) and tai (たい). Conversely, the copula may also be omitted entirely. The conjectural form (darou (だ)) in standard Japanese) is jarou (じゃろう) or yarou (やろう), whilst the past tense (datta (だった, was) in standard Japanese) is jatta (じゃった) or yatta (やった). For the negative form of verbs, the formula [-nai (-ない) stem + n (ん)] is used. Among older speakers, the past tense negative formula [-nai stem + njatta (んじゃった)] is used, like in ikanjatta (行かんじゃった, did not go), whereas younger speakers prefer [-nai stem + nyatta (んやった) / nkatta (んかった)], e.g., ikanyatta (行かんやった), ikankatta (行かんかった).

==== Progressive and perfect aspects ====
Like Western Japanese and other Kyushu dialects and unlike Eastern Japanese dialects (including standard Japanese), there is a distinction between the progressive aspect and perfect aspect in the Chikuzen dialect. -Yoru (-よる) or -you (-よう) is used for the progressive aspect, whilst -toru (-とる) or -tou (-とう) is used for the perfective aspect. In the Chikuhou region, -choru (-ちょる) or -chou (-ちょう) may also be used for the perfective aspect.

==== Potential form and hearsay ====
The Chikuzen dialect makes a distinction between situational potential (e.g., when am really tired, I can sleep on the floor) and the potential of someone or something to do something (e.g., I can sleep on the floor). For the former, -ruru (-るる) or -raruru (-らるる) are attached to the -masu stem of a verb, whilst for the latter -kiru (-きる) is attached instead. The bound auxiliaries gotoaru (ごとある) and gotaru (ごたる) are used with the same meaning as you (da) (よう(だ), like/seeming to be), and gena (げな) is used to express hearsay.

==== Polite speech ====
There are several bound auxiliary words used to express politeness in the Chikuzen dialect. -sharu (-しゃる) and -rassharu (-らっしゃる) are used after the -nai stem of verbs to add politeness, a trait also found in the Chikugo dialect. A word unique to the Chikuzen dialect, -nsharu (-んしゃる), attaches to the -masu stem of verbs and contains a nuance of familiarity or closeness with the listener. Below are some examples of polite speech in the Chikuzen dialect.

- Ikassharu (行かっしゃる, go).
- Taberassharu (食べらっしゃる, eat).
- Ikinshatta (行きんしゃった, went).

The highly polite nasaru (なさる) and less polite naru (なる) are both used, with nsaru (んさる) being found in the Munakata District. Aside from the standard polite conjugation of nasaru (i.e., nasaimasu (なさいます)), there are a variety of forms derived from the attaching of -masu, including: nasasu (なさす), nasu (なす) and nazasu (なざす). For the progressive and perfect aspects, -tearu (-てある) is used. -Tearu can also be contracted to a less polite variation, -charu (-ちゃる). Below is an example sentence using -tearu.

- Shenshee, nanba shitearu to desu ka? (しぇんしぇー、なんばしてあるとですか? What are you doing sir (to a teacher) (polite)) compared to sensei, nani wo nasatteiru no desu ka? (先生、何をなさっているのですか?) in standard Japanese.

Gozaru (ござる) is used as a highly polite form of iru (いる) and kuru (来る) and as a bound auxiliary, whilst -tsukaasai (-つかあさい, please do…) is used as an equivalent to -te kudasai (-てください). Gozasu (ござす) is used alongside desu (です) and -masu as a polite bound auxiliary, and all forms may have geminate consonant (small tsu (っ)) insertion, for example -massen (-まっせん) as opposed to -masen (-ません), -gozassen (ござっせん) as opposed to -gozasen (-ござせん) and desshou (でっしょう) as opposed to deshou (でしょう). In some areas, such as Fukuoka City and Itoshima, two additional polite bound auxiliaries, -dasu (-だす) and -rasu (-らす), are also used.

=== Particles ===
==== Case-marking and adverbial particles ====
In the western and southern parts of the dialect area, no (の) is used as a nominative case-marking particle (ga (が) in standard Japanese). Ga is also used, but with a slightly distinct meaning. No contains a nuance of respectfulness towards the person being discussed, whilst ga is used for either expressing a degree of self-abasement or humility, or for more clearly emphasising who or what is being discussed. In the eastern part of the dialect area, only ga is used.

Other notable particles include:

- To (と) and tsu (つ) - Used as equivalents to the question-marking particle no (の). Tsu is found exclusively in the western dialect area.
- Ba (ば) – Equivalent to the accusative case-marking particle wo (を). Used predominantly in western and southern areas.
- Sai (さい), sae (さえ), ni (に) and i (い) – All used to indicate direction (ni (に) in standard Japanese).
- Ni (に) and ge (げ) – Both used to indicate the target of an action (just ni in standard Japanese). For example, mi ni iku (見に行く, to go and see) à mi ge iku (見げ行く).

==== Conjunctive, sentence-ending and interjectory particles ====
Western and southern dialect speakers use ken (けん) in place of kara (から, because/so), and kenga (けんが) for emphasis. In the Chikuho area, ki (き) may be used instead. Batten (ばってん) and batte (ばって) are used as equivalents to the contrastive conjunction keredomo (けれども, but/although), whilst taccha(a) (たっちゃ(あ)) functions as a contrastive and hypothetical particle. The particles bai (ばい)and tai (たい), shared among all Hichiku dialects, can be used in place of ja or ya as copulas. Tai is used for self-evident or objectively true statements, whilst bai contains a subjective nuance and is often used to express one’s own thoughts, as well as to share information previously unknown to the listener. The sentence-ending particle na (な) is often elongated to naa (なぁ) or is sometimes said as nee (ねぇ). Another sentence-ending particle, ga (が), is added to express an element of persuasiveness or insistence, whilst the particle kusa (くさ) can be used as both a sentence-ender and interjectory.
