= Agglutinative language =

Type of synthetic language

An agglutinative language is a type of language that primarily forms words by stringing together morphemes (word parts)—each typically representing a single grammatical meaning—without significant modification to their forms (agglutinations). In such languages, affixes (prefixes, suffixes, infixes, or circumfixes) are added to a root word in a linear and systematic way, creating complex words that encode detailed grammatical information. This structure allows for a high degree of transparency, as the boundaries between morphemes are usually clear and their meanings consistent.

Agglutinative languages are a subset of synthetic languages. Within this category, they are distinguished from fusional languages, where morphemes often blend or change form to express multiple grammatical functions, and from polysynthetic languages, which can combine numerous morphemes into single words with complex meanings. Examples of agglutinative languages include Austronesian languages (e.g., Filipino, Malay, Javanese, Formosan languages), Turkic languages, Dravidian languages (e.g., Tamil, Malayalam, Kannada, Telugu, Brahui), Bantu languages (e.g. Swahili, Zulu, Xhosa, Shona, and Lingala), Hungarian, Finnish, Basque, Estonian, Mongolian, Manchu, Japanese, and Korean.

Despite occasional outliers, agglutinative languages tend to have more easily deducible word meanings compared to fusional languages, which allow unpredictable modifications in either or both the phonetics or morphology of one or more morphemes within a word.

== Overview ==
Agglutinative languages have generally one grammatical category per affix while fusional languages combine multiple into one. The term was introduced by Wilhelm von Humboldt to classify languages from a morphological point of view. It is derived from the Latin verb agglutinare, which means "to glue together". For example, the English word antidisestablishmentarianism can be broken up into anti- "against", dis- "to deprive of", establish (here referring to the formation of the Church of England), -ment "the act of", -arian "a person who", and -ism "the ideology of". On the other hand, in a word such as runs, the singular suffix -s indicates the verb is both in third person and present tense, and cannot be further broken down into a "third person" morpheme and a "present tense" morpheme; this behavior is reminiscent of fusional languages.

The term agglutinative is sometimes incorrectly used as a synonym for synthetic, because that term also includes fusional languages. The agglutinative and fusional languages are two ends of a continuum, with various languages falling more toward one end or the other. For example, Japanese is generally agglutinative, but displays fusion in some nouns, such as otōto (弟; "younger brother"), from oto + hito (originally woto + hito, "young, younger" + "person"), and Japanese verbs, adjectives, the copula, and their affixes undergo sound transformations. For example, kaku (書く; "to write; [someone] writes") affixed with masu (ます; politeness suffix) and ta (た; past tense marker) becomes kakimashita (書きました; "[someone] wrote", with the -mas- portion used to express a politely distanced social context to the intended audience). A synthetic language may use morphological agglutination combined with partial usage of fusional features, for example in its case system (e.g., German, Dutch, and Persian).

Persian has some features of agglutination, making use of prefixes and suffixes attached to the stems of verbs and nouns. Persian is a subject–object–verb (SOV) language, thus having a head-final phrase structure. Persian utilizes a noun root + plural suffix + case suffix + post-position suffix syntax similar to Turkish. For example the phrase "xodróhāyešān-rā minegaristam/خودروهای‌شان را می‌نگریستم" meaning 'I was looking at their cars' lit. '(cars their at) (I was looking)'. Breaking down the first word: خودرو xodró (car) + ها(ی) hāye (plural suffix) + شان šān (possessive suffix) + را rā (post-positional suffix) becomes خودروهای‌شان را/xodróhāyešān-rā. One can see its agglutinative nature and the fact that Persian is able to affix a given number of dependent morphemes to a root morpheme, xodró (car).

Turkish is generally agglutinative, forming words in a similar manner: araba (car) + lar (plural) + ın (possessive suffix, performing the same function as "of" in English) + a (dative suffix, for the recipient of an action, like "to" in English) forms arabalarına (lit. 'to their cars'). However, these suffixes depend upon vowel harmony: doing the same to ev ("house") forms evlerine (to their houses). However, there are other features of the Turkish language that could be considered fusional, such as the suffixes for the simple present tense. This is the only tense where, rather than having a suffix did negation which can be included before the temporal suffix, there are two different suffixes – one for affirmative and one for negative. Giving examples using sevmek ("to love" or "to like"):

English	Turkish	Formation			
I liked	sevdim	sev- "like"		-di (past tense)	-m (first person singular)
I did not like	sevmedim	sev- "like"	-me "not"	-di (past tense)	-m (first person singular)
I like	severim	sev- "like"		-er (present tense)	-im (first person singular)
I do not like	sevmem	sev- "like"		-me (negative present tense)	-m (first person singular)

Agglutinative languages tend to have a high rate of affixes or morphemes per word, and to be very regular, in particular with very few irregular verbs – for example, Japanese has only two considered fully irregular, and only about a dozen others with only minor irregularity; Luganda has only one (or two, depending on how "irregular" is defined); while in the Quechua languages, all ordinary verbs are regular. Again, exceptions exist, such as in Georgian.

== Trends ==
Many unrelated languages spoken by Ancient Near East peoples were agglutinative, though none from larger families have been identified:

- Elamite
- Hattic
- Kassite
- Sumerian

Some well known constructed languages are agglutinative, such as Black Speech, Esperanto, Klingon, Na'vi, and Quenya.

Agglutination is a typological feature and does not imply a linguistic relation, but there are some families of agglutinative languages. For example, the Proto-Uralic language, the ancestor of the Uralic languages, was agglutinative, and most descendant languages inherit this feature, this was also the case with Proto-Austronesian and its daughter languages. But since agglutination can arise in languages that previously had a non-agglutinative typology, and it can be lost in languages that previously were agglutinative, agglutination as a typological trait cannot be used as evidence of a genetic relationship to other agglutinative languages. The uncertain theory about Ural-Altaic proffers that there is a genetic relationship with this proto-language as seen in Finnish, Mongolian and Turkish, and occasionally as well as Manchurian, Japanese and Korean.

There are also instances when a language that was previously agglutinating can become isolating or analytic over time. Proto-Sino-Tibetan is most likely theorized to have been an agglutinative synthetic language, a characteristic which its Sinitic daughter languages eventually lost by the time of the Han dynasty. Burmese, while retaining its ancestor's morphological markers and agglutination, evolved into a more analytical language over time.

Many languages have developed agglutination. This developmental phenomenon is known as language drift, such as Indonesian and Malay. There seems to exist a preferred evolutionary direction from agglutinative synthetic languages to fusional synthetic languages, and then to non-synthetic languages, which in their turn evolve into isolating languages and from there again into agglutinative synthetic languages. However, this is just a trend, and in itself a combination of the trend observable in grammaticalization theory and that of general linguistic attrition, especially word-final apocope and elision.
