= Saga dialect =

Japanese dialect of Saga

- Native to: Japan
- Region: Saga Prefecture
- Language family: Japonic: Japanese; Kyushu Japanese; Hichiku; Saga dialect

Language codes
- ISO 639-3: –
- Glottolog: saga1265
- IETF: ja-u-sd-jp41

The Saga dialect (佐賀弁, Saga-ben) is a dialect of the Japanese language widely spoken in Saga Prefecture and some other areas, such as Isahaya. It is influenced by Kyushu dialect and Hichiku dialect. Saga-ben is further divided by accents centered on individual towns.

The Saga dialect, like most dialects of rural Kyushu, can be nearly unintelligible to people who are accustomed to standard Japanese. A popular urban legend has it that two Saga-ben speakers met up in Tokyo and bystanders mistook their dialect for Chinese.

== Characteristics ==
Many of Saga's dialectical properties are variants, in particles or conjugations, of standard Japanese.

- Words are often repeated twice.
- The sentence-ending particle "よ" (yo) becomes "ばい" (bai) or "たい" (tai).
- The contrastive conjunction "ばってん" (batten) (somewhat equivalent to English's "however") replaces standard Japanese equivalents.
- The operative particle "を" (o) is replaced with "ば".
  - Ex.:手紙ば書いた=Wrote [a] letter.
- The particle "が" (ga), when referring to other people, is replaced with "の" (no).
  - Ex.:黒君の書いた=Kuro-kun wrote [it].
- Traditional masu-form keigo is replaced by the suffix "～しんさつ" (shinsatsu), "～しんさる" (shinsaru), "～しよんさつ"(shonsatsu), or "～しよんさる" (shonsaru).
  - Ex.:手紙をかきよんさった=Wrote [polite] [a] letter.
- The direction particles "に" (ni) and "へ" (he) are replaced with "さい" (sai).
  - Ex.:学校さい行く=Go to school.
- The explanatory "の" is replaced by "と" (to).
  - Ex.:手紙を書いたと？= Wrote [a] letter [explanation request].
- The continuative conjugation "～ている" (teiru)becomes "とっ".
  - Ex.:書いとっ=[Someone is] writing.
- In the passive conjugation of a verb, "れ" (re) is taken out and "る" (ru) becomes a long vowel, or doubles the next consonant.
  - Ex.:書かれる (writing; passive voice) becomes replaced with 書かるう or 書かるっ.
- I-adjectives have their "い" (I)s replaced with "か" (ka)s.
  - Ex.: cold (寒い) becomes 寒か.
- Na-adjectives sometimes have a か added on, reminiscent of the above characteristic. This seems to happen more in the south.
  - Ex.: じょうず (joozu) becomes じょうずか (joozuka).
- Pronunciation is similar to Hakata dialect in the following: "sa, shi, su, se, so" become "sha, shii, shu, she, sho". In addition, Saga-ben also has the unique pronunciations of "za, zu, ze, da, ga," and "na" rendered as "ja, ju, je, ja, gya," and "nya", respectively.
- "～ない" (nai) conjugations become "ん" (n) the "ない" adjective itself becomes "なか" (naka)). This reflects the negative archaic/rude conjugation in standard Japanese. For example, whereas 食べん would be rude in eastern Japan, in Saga-ben it is standard.
  - Ex.:分からない becomes 分からん
- The Saga-ben version of 好きじゃない is either 好かん or 好きじゃなか
- I-adjectives' "い"s become "さ" (sa) in when the speaker wants to add strong emphasis.
- I-adjectives' continuative form's "く" (ku) becomes a modifying "う" (u) that elongates and possibly changes the vowel of the character before it.
  - Ex.:interesting (continuative) (おもしろく (omoshiroku)) becomes "おもしろう" (omoshiroo); fun (continuative) (楽しく) becomes 楽しゅう.

=== これ, それ, あれ, どれ (kore, sore, are, dore) Series ===
The Demonstrative series is uniquely pronounced in Saga-dialect.

- The normal これ, それ, あれ, どれ series in Japanese (this, that, yon, and which respectively) has its れ sounds replaced with い. 俺 also follows this pattern, and becomes おい (oi). Indeed, many words follow this pattern; even 誰 becomes だい (dai).
- The related words どう (doo), こう (koo), and そう (soo) become どがん (dogan), そがん (sogan), and こがん (kogan), respectively. An even more rustic conjugation set of these words is どぎゃん (dogyan), そぎゃん (sogyan), and こぎゃん (kogyan).

== Vocabulary ==
Saga-ben contains much characteristic vocabulary. Examples are included (with standard Japanese, where applicable) in the following table:

Saga-ben vocabulary
Saga-ben	Standard Japanese	English gloss
おばっちゃん (o-batchan)	おば-ちゃん (o-bachan)	granny
いわじいにゃ (iwajiinya)	言わないのよ	I'm not saying
きんしゃ (kinsha)	来る	Come
あばかん (abakan)	-	Too small, and cannot be fit into
がばい (gabai)	すごく(sugoku)	Terribly; extremely
～ごた (gota)	のようだ (noyooda)	It's that way
うーか (uuka)	多い	Many
うすか (usuka)	怖い	Scary
くさい (kusai)	だ！;だよ！(da! ; dayo)	(copula; affirmative particle)
しぎーのする (shigiinosuru)	しびれる (shibireru)	Fall asleep (of a limb)
じゃーた (Jaata)	出した	came out
すらごと (suragoto)	嘘 (uso)	Falsehood
とっとっと (tottotto)	取っているの	taken/reserved (w/explanation particle)
～とけ (toke)	なのに (nanoni)	despite~
ふうけもん (fuukemon)	バカ	idiot
みたんなか (mitannaka)	みっともない (mittomonai)	shameful; extremely
きゃーないた (kyaanaita)	疲れた	tired
ぎゃーけした (gyaakeshita)	風邪をひった	caught a cold
～やろー (yaroo)	〜なんでしょう;〜だろ (nandeshoo; daro)	I guess; probably (rhetorical)
～やん (yan)	〜じゃん (jan)	isn't it (affirmative).
えいくろった (eikurotta)	酔っ払った	inebriated
ひやがいーめし (hiyagaiimeshi)	昼食	lunch
いっちょん (itchon)	全く	completely
やぐらしい (yagurashii)	うるさい (urusaii)	annoying
あちゃこちゃ (achakocha)	あちこち (achikochi)	here and there
そいぎんた (soiginta)	さよなら/さようなら (sayonara/sayounara)	goodbye
ちゃがつか (chagatsuka)	恥ずかしい(hazugashii)	embarrassing

== Cultural references ==
- Saga-ben was heavily spoken in the 2006 film, and now television series, "Gabai bā-chan" (lit. fantastic grandma). The title itself is in Saga-ben.
- The protagonist of Zombie Land Saga Minamoto Sakura speaks in Saga-ben, specifically the Karatsu variant.
- In the Japanese dub of Yuri on Ice, many of the characters who live in Kyushu speak Saga-ben.

== See also ==
- Japanese dialects
