= Tashiro Station =

Railway station in Tosu, Saga Prefecture, Japan

JB 14 Tashiro Station 田代駅
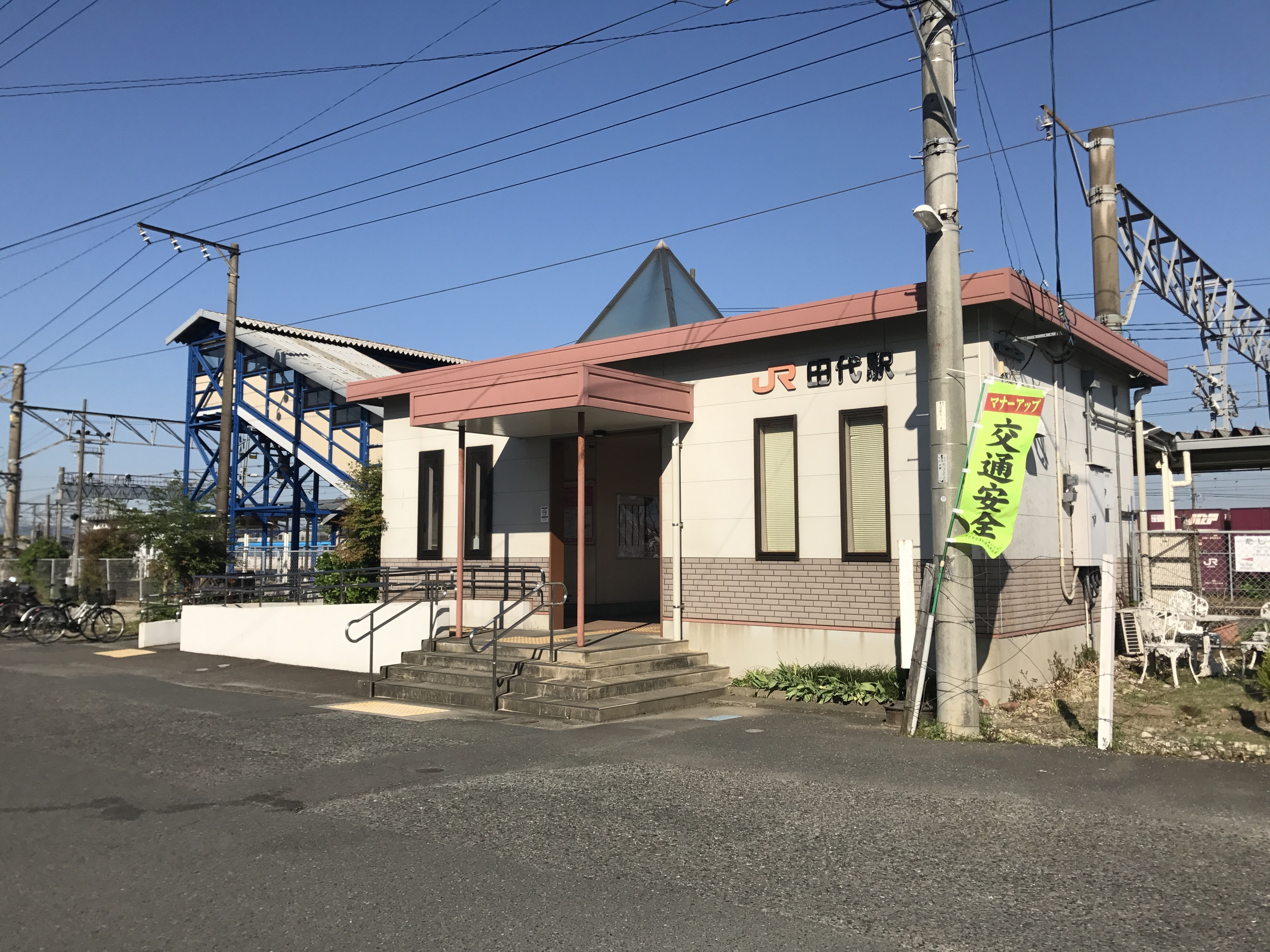
- Tashiro Station in April 2017

General information
- Location: Sakuramach, Tosu-shi, Saga-ken; Japan
- Coordinates: 33°23′02″N 130°31′27″E
- Operator: JR Kyushu
- Line: JB Kagoshima Main Line
- Distance: 105.6 km from Mojikō
- Platforms: 2 side platforms
- Tracks: 2

Construction
- Structure type: At grade

Other information
- Status: Staffed
- Website: Official website

History
- Opened: 11 December 1889

Passengers
- FY2022: 503 daily
- Rank: 214th (among JR Kyushu stations)

Services
Preceding station	JR Kyushu	Following station
Tosu towards Kagoshima	Kagoshima Main Line	Yayoigaoka towards Mojikō
Location
- Location within Saga Prefecture Location within Japan

Tashiro Station (田代駅, Tashiro-eki) is a passenger railway station located in the city of Tosu, Saga Prefecture, Japan. It is operated by JR Kyushu.

== Lines ==
The station is served by the Kagoshima Main Line and is located 105.6 km from the starting point of the line at Mojikō.

== Layout ==
The station consists of two side platforms serving two tracks, connected by a footbridge. The station is unattended.

=== Platforms ===
1	■ JB Kagoshima Main Line	for Kokura and Hakata
2	■ JB Kagoshima Main Line	for Kurume, Ōmuta

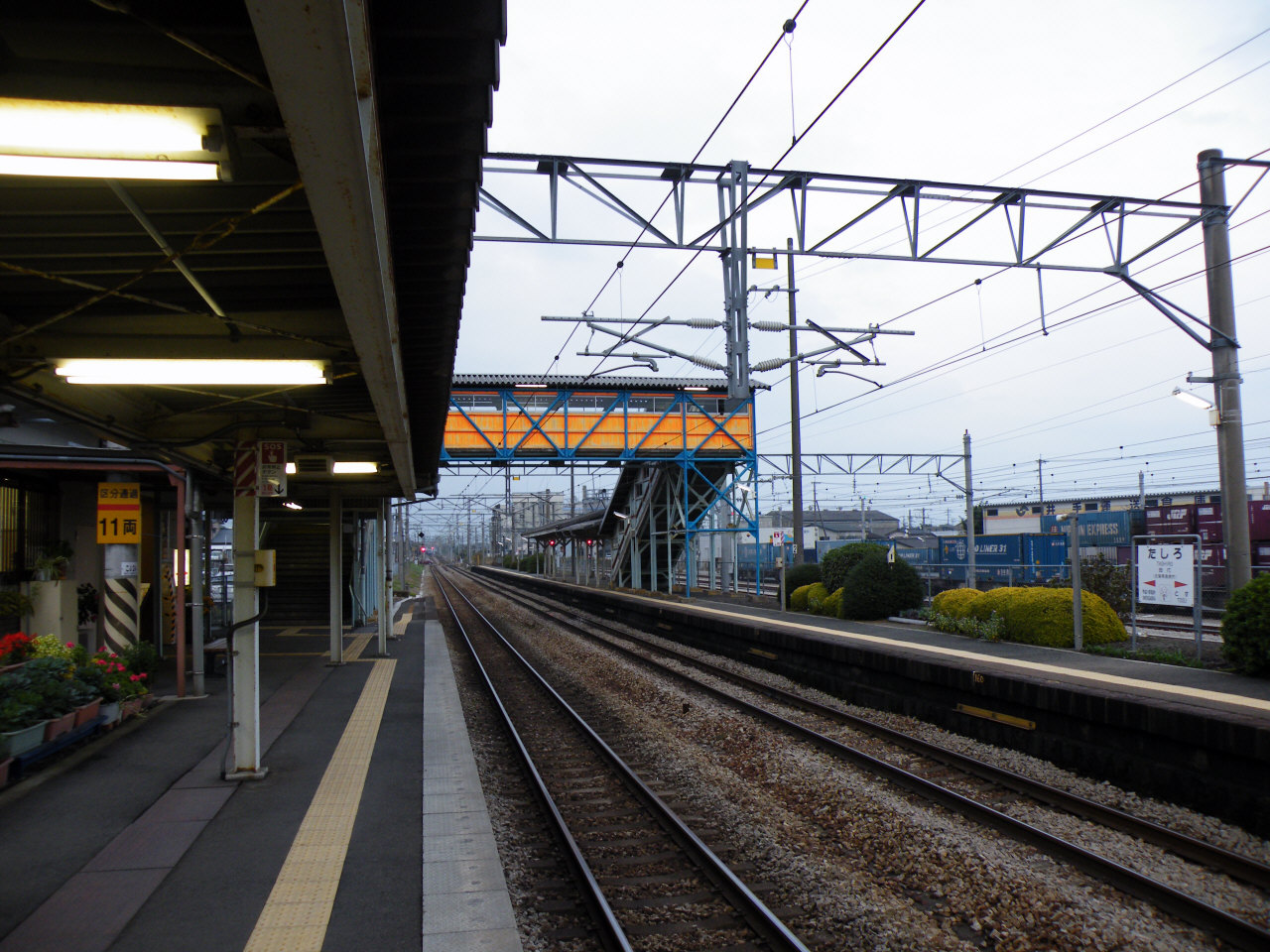
A view of the station platforms. The Tosu Freight Terminal can be seen to the right.

== History ==
The station was opened on 11 December 1889 by the privately run Kyushu Railway after the construction of a track between Hakata and the (now closed) Chitosegawa temporary stop with Tashiro as one of several intermediate stations on the line. When the Kyushu Railway was nationalized on 1 July 1907, Japanese Government Railways (JGR) took over control of the station. On 12 October 1909, the station became part of the Hitoyoshi Main Line and then on 21 November 1909, part of the Kagoshima Main Line. With the privatization of Japanese National Railways (JNR), the successor of JGR, on 1 April 1987, JR Kyushu took over control of the station. On 18 March 2006, the Tosu Freight Terminal opened just to the north of the station.

== Passenger statistics ==
In fiscal 2020, the station was used by an average of 503 passengers daily (boarding passengers only), and it ranked 214th among the busiest stations of JR Kyushu.

== Surrounding area ==
- Kyushu Environmental Welfare Medical College
- Tosu Freight Terminal Station (Station of the JR Freight. It is added to the back of this station.)
- Hisamitsu Pharmaceutical Kyushu Head Office

== See also ==
- List of railway stations in Japan
