= Kumamoto dialect =

Japanese dialect of Kumamoto

- 熊本弁
- Native to: Japan
- Region: Kumamoto
- Language family: Japonic: Japanese; Kyushu; Kumamoto dialect

Language codes
- ISO 639-3: –
- Glottolog: kuma1281

Kumamoto dialect (熊本弁, Kumamoto-ben) is a dialect of the Japanese language spoken in Kumamoto Prefecture. It belongs to the Hichiku group, and shares similarities with other nearby dialects in Kyushu.

== Features ==
=== Adjectives ===
The I adjective in Standard Japanese becomes "か" (ka) in Kumamoto dialect:

うまい (umai, "tasty") > うまか (umaka)

よい (yoi, "good") > よか (yoka)

This feature is found in other Kyushu dialects. The negative conjugation "ない" (nai) also becomes "なか" (naka).

=== Accent ===
Unlike Standard Japanese, Kumamoto dialect is described as "accentless", meaning it has no fixed tonal pattern.

=== Words ===
Kumamoto dialect has a different set of Ko-so-a-do words:

これ (kore, "this") > こっ (ko')

それ (sore, "that") > そっ (so')

あれ (are, "that over there") > あっ (a')

どれ (dore, "which") > どっ (do')
