= Japanese godan and ichidan verbs =

Two main types of verbs in the Japanese language

The Japanese language has two main types of verbs: godan verbs, or quinquegrade verbs (五段動詞, godan-dōshi), and ichidan verbs, or unigrade verbs (一段動詞, ichidan-dōshi).

== Terminology ==
Categories are important when conjugating Japanese verbs, since conjugation patterns vary according to the verb's category. For example, 切る (kiru) and 見る (miru) belong to different verb categories (quinquegrade and unigrade, respectively) and therefore follow different conjugation patterns. Most Japanese verbs are allocated into two categories:

1. Quinquegrade, quinquigrade, quinquagrade or pentagrade verbs (五段動詞, godan-dōshi)
2. Unigrade or monograde verbs (一段動詞, ichidan-dōshi)

Statistically, there are about twice as many quinquegrade verbs than unigrade verbs.

Classical Japanese had more verb groups, such as bigrade verbs (二段動詞, nidan-dōshi) and quadrigrade verbs (四段動詞, yodan-dōshi), which are archaic in Modern Japanese.

The word grade in quinquegrade and unigrade is translated from dan (段). (Note: The most familiar use of this Japanese word in English contexts is for ranking in martial arts.) In grammar, dan is a synonym for retsu (列) and opposite to gyō (行). The translations for dan/retsu and gyō vary, either of them can be translated as "row" or "column" depending on how the gojūon table is laid out, (Note: In other contexts where clarity is needed, such as spreadsheets, gyō is "row" and retsu is "column.") but the distinction is simply that gyō is named after consonants, as ka-row (か行, ka-gyō), while dan/retsu is named after vowels, as in i-column (い列, i-retsu) or i-grade (い段, i-dan). The a-row (あ行, a-gyō) consists the kana a (あ), i (い), u (う), e (え), o (お), which differ only by vowels; while the a-grade (あ段, a-dan) consists of the kana a (あ), ka (か), ga (が), sa (さ), za (ざ), ta (た), da (だ), na (な), ha (は), ba (ば), pa (ぱ), ma (ま), ya (や), ra (ら), wa (わ), which differ only by consonants.

The quinquegrade (五段, godan) class consists of verbs whose inflection forms make use of all five grades, or five vowels. For example, the inflection forms of the verb kaku (書く; "to write; to draw", ka-row) are kaka (書か)/kako (書こ), kaki (書き), kaku (書く), and kake (書け). These verbs developed from the earlier quadrigrade (四段, yodan) class, after a historical sound change that turned such forms like kakamu (書かむ) into kakō (書こう) and resulted in an additional vowel (see Late Middle Japanese).

The unigrade (一段, ichidan) class consists of verbs that occupy only one grade, or one vowel. Dictionaries may further divide this class into "upper unigrade" (上一段, kamiichidan)) if the vowel is the "upper" i, and "lower unigrade" (下一段, shimoichidan)) if the vowel is the "lower" e. The verb miru (見る; "to look", ma-row), whose inflection forms are mi (見), miru (見る), mire (見れ) and miro (見ろ)/miyo (見よ), is an example of an "upper unigrade" verb, and the verb eru (得る; "to earn", a-row) is a "lower unigrade" verb. Some unigrade verbs evolved from earlier forms of bigrade verbs (upper bigrade (上二段, kaminidan) (sometimes also known as "middle bigrade" (中二段, nakanidan)) and lower bigrade (下二段, shimonidan)).

Dictionaries often list ancestral forms of modern verbs as well as their classes. Thus, the entry for kaku may include a note like （動カ五［四］）, which means "verb, ka-row, quinquegrade, formerly quadrigrade"); while the entry for ukeru (受ける; "to take") may include （動カ下一）[文]カ下二 う・く, which means "verb, ka-row, lower unigrade, lower bigrade equivalent in Classical Japanese is uku (受く)".

Note that the choices of prefixes in these English terms by some authors are rather inconsistent: while mono- and penta- are Greek, uni-, bi-, quadri- and quinque- are Latin (see Numeral prefix § Table of number prefixes in English). The word grade is actually Latin, not Greek in origin. While many authors use bigrade and quadrigrade consistently, they also use any combination of unigrade, monograde, quinquegrade, quinquigrade and pentagrade. Some dispense with quinquegrade (五段, godan) altogether and prefer only quadrigrade (四段, yodan) even for modern Japanese (see Godan vs yodan below). Plain English alternatives to "unigrade", "bigrade", "quadrigrade" and "quinquegrade" include "one-grade", "two-grade", "four-grade" and "five-grade"; "one row", "two row" and "four row"; "one-step", "two-step", "four-step" and "five-step"; (Note: "Step" is another translation for dan.) or "one-vowel", "two-vowel" and "four-vowel".

Some Western analyses refer to "quinquegrade" verbs as "consonant-stem" verbs. Such analyses may represent the root form of the verb 書く as kak-, emphasizing the unchanging consonant k. "Unigrade" verbs are then referred to as "vowel-stem" verbs, for example 見る analyzed as mi-.

Historically, the so-called "irregular" (変格, henkaku) verbs suru (する) and kuru (来る) were sometimes known as "trigrade" (三段, sandan), given that their forms contain three out of the five vowels of Japanese.

Here is a visualization that compares various verb conjugations to an extracted column of the gojūon table.

Gojūon table 'ma' column	Negative	Polite	Dictionary	Potential	Volitional	
ま (ma)	読まない yomanai					
み (mi)	みない minai	読みます yomimasu みます mimasu	みる miru	みられる mirareru	みよう miyō	← Upper unigrade verb 見る (to see)
む (mu)			読む yomu			
め (me)	止めない tomenai	止めます tomemasu	止める tomeru	読める yomeru 止められる tomerareru	止めよう tomeyō	← Lower unigrade verb 止める (to stop)
も (mo)					読もう yomō	
						↖ Quinquegrade verb 読む (to read)

In the table above, the verb 読む (yomu, to read) uses kana from all 5 rows of the gojūon table in its inflectional suffix—ま (ma), み (mi), む (mu), め (me) and も (mo)—amongst its conjugations. Thus, it is classified as a "class-5" (or more formally "quinquegrade") verb. Meanwhile, the verbs 見る (to see) and 止める (to stop) each use kana from only 1 row of the gojūon table in their verb-stem's suffix—み (mi) and め (me) respectively. Thus, they are classified as a "class-1" (or more formally "unigrade") verbs.

=== Godan vs. yodan ===
All modern godan verbs are derived from historical yodan verbs. The distinction between these two classes relies solely on the interaction between the mizenkei (未然形) and the "tentative" (推量, suiryō) auxiliary u (う) (historically, mu (む)). Consider the verb kaku (書く; "to write"):

- kaka- + -mu → kakamu (historical form) → kakau (historical form) → kakō (modern form)

The shift of vowels from au to ō was regular and expansive during Late Middle Japanese, and it practically introduced an additional dan (段; in other words, vowel) to the inflectional forms of yodan verbs:

Inflection of kaku (書く; "to write")
yodan (四段)	mizenkei (未然形)	ren'yōkei (連用形)	shūshikei (終止形)	rentaikei (連体形)	izenkei (已然形)	meireikei (命令形)
yodan (四段)	kaka-	kaki	kaku		kake	
godan (五段)	mizenkei (未然形)	ren'yōkei (連用形)	shūshikei (終止形)	rentaikei (連体形)	kateikei (仮定形)	meireikei (命令形)
godan (五段)	kaka- → kako-(u)	kaki	kaku		kake	

The term godan (五段) is a fairly modern coinage. During the time when modern kana usage was being adopted to write modern Japanese (口語, kōgo; lit. 'spoken language') in place of historical kana usage, one of the changes concerned how such a form as kakō should be spelt. The modern spelling かこう was proposed along with godan as the name for the modernized yodan class. Traditionalist grammarians, on the other hand, would insist on such spelling as かかう to reflect the historical pronunciation kakau, and on the modern pronunciation being inferred from such spelling. Some argued that a single interaction with the auxiliary u did not justify creating an entire new grammatical class, given that the mizenkei does not involve a vowel shift with any other auxiliary:

- kaka- + -nai → kakanai
- kaka- + -nu → kakanu
- kaka- + -n (Note: Alternative form of either "tentative" -mu or "negative" -nu.) → kakan
- kaka- + -zu → kakazu

Moreover, the auxiliary -ta and the particle -te also notably alter the ren'yōkei:

- kaki + -ta/-te → kaita/te
- omoi + -ta/-te → omotta/te
- yomi + -ta/-te → yonda/de

Yet, such alterations are not reflected by either the term yodan or the term godan at all, despite occurring in both these supposedly different inflections (although in classical Japanese (文語, bungo; lit. 'written language'), these alterations in pronunciation must be inferred from the spellings). This means that exceptional interactions with auxiliaries and particles like these ought not to be the basis for naming verb classes.

Obviously, the spelling reform took place and the term godan became mainstream. Historical kana usage is now reserved only for the writing of classical Japanese, and yodan verbs are largely considered a classical Japanese class while godan verbs make up a fundamental part of modern Japanese.

=== Japanese language education ===
Within Japanese language education, various terminologies are used in lieu of the Japanese nomenclature for "quinquegrade" and "unigrade" verbs.

	Quinquegrade verbs	Unigrade verbs	Irregular verbs	Example literature
Common terminology	Group 1	Group 2	Group 3	A Dictionary of Basic Japanese Grammar
Common terminology	Group I	Group II	Group III	A Dictionary of Basic Japanese Grammar
Uncommon terminology	う-verbs (u-verbs)	る-verbs (ru-verbs)	Irregular verbs	GENKI
Rare terminology	Consonant stem verbals	Vowel stem verbals	-	Japanese: The Spoken Language

In literature adopting the "Group I / II / III" terminology, the terms (I), (II) or (III) may be notated beside verbs. Similarly, (う) or (る) may be notated beside verbs in literature adopting the "う-verbs / る-verbs" terminology.

==== Consonant and vowel nomenclature ====
The terms "consonant stem verbs" and "vowel stem verbs" come from a pattern that emerges from studying the actual structure of the words rather than the written representation. When considering the invariant part of the verb (the verb stem), the final phoneme determines the classification of the verb group. If the verb stem's final phoneme:

- is a consonant, then it is a consonant stem verb (quinquegrade verb)
- is a vowel, then it is a vowel stem verb (unigrade verb)

	読む (to read)	走る (to run)	見る (to see)	食べる (to eat)
Negative	yom.anai 読まない	hashir.anai 走らない	mi.nai 見ない	tabe.nai 食べない
Polite form	yom.imasu 読みます	hashir.imasu 走ります	mi.masu 見ます	tabe.masu 食べます
Plain form	yom.u 読む	hashir.u 走る	mi.ru 見る	tabe.ru 食べる
Potential form	yom.eru 読める	hashir.eru 走れる	mi.rareru 見られる	tabe.rareru 食べられる
Volitional form	yom.ou 読もう	hashir.ou 走ろう	mi.you 見よう	tabe.you 食べよう
Invariant rōmaji	yom	hashir	mi	tabe
Final letter	m → consonant	r → consonant	i → vowel	e → vowel
Classification	Consonant stem	Consonant stem	Vowel stem	Vowel stem

There are criticisms of the consonant and vowel nomenclature:

1. When quinquegrade verbs end with "う" (u), the verb's invariant stem always ends with a vowel, yet is still classified as having a consonant stem. For example, 買う (kau, to buy) has the vowel "a" as the invariant suffix, yet it is still categorized as a "consonant stem verb".
  In these cases, this apparent expection is resolved by realizing that the verb's invariant stem ends in the consonant w. The w is normally suppressed, but surfaces in the negative form, as seen in 買わない (kawanai, to not buy). Traditionally these verbs ended in -hu, which is still seen on occasion in historical kana usage, and thus unambiguously ended in h.
2. When godan verbs end with "つ" (tsu), the verb's invariant stem always ends with an "s" rather than a "t". Since the consonant stem terminology focuses on rōmaji, this could lead to conjugation errors. For example, 待つ (matsu, to wait) in its negative conjugation does not become "待つぁない" (matsanai) as the consonant stem system might have one believe; the correct conjugation is 待たない (matanai, to not wait). The matter is resolved when phonemic notation of "tu" used by Kunrei-shiki romanization is applied instead.
3. In the case of the past-tense and te forms of conjugation, the 'invariant' stem changes such that the consonant is removed from all godan verbs (except verbs ending in "つ" (tsu) or "す" (su)). This means the defining characteristic of consonant stem verbs cannot be used to define consonant stem verbs for the past-tense or te forms. The true "invariant stem", which is consistent amongst all conjugations, precedes the so-called "invariant consonant".

== Verb classification ==
Classifying verbs is simple in theory:

1. Take the verb in its plain, negative form. The result will be: verb-stem + ない (nai)
2. If the last character of the verb-stem (ignoring the "ない"):

- rhymes with 〜ぁ (-a), then it is a quinquegrade verb
- rhymes with 〜ぃ (-i) or 〜ぇ (-e), then it is a unigrade verb

Negative verb	Last character of verb stem	Rhymes with	Group
思わない (omowanai, to not think)	わ (wa)	〜ぁ (-a) →	Quinquegrade verb
行かない (ikanai, to not go)	か (ka)	〜ぁ (-a) →	Quinquegrade verb
起きない (okinai, to not wake up)	き (ki)	〜ぃ (-i) →	Unigrade verb
食べない (tabenai, to not eat)	べ (be)	〜ぇ (-e) →	Unigrade verb

This classification system works for all Japanese verbs, with three exceptions: ある (aru) is a quinquegrade verb, and both しない (shinai) and こない (konai) are instead classified as irregular verbs.

=== Dot notation ===
In some Japanese dictionaries, the readings of conjugable words may have the stem and the inflectional suffix separated by a dot (・). For example, the adjective 赤い (akai, red) may be written as あか・い (aka·i) to separate the static prefix from the dynamic suffix.

This system also describes the verb group classification: in quinquegrade verbs, the dot is placed before the last kana; in unigrade verbs, the dot is placed before the last 2 kana (except for 2-kana unigrade verbs, which have no dot).

	3-kana verbs	2-kana verbs
Quinquegrade verbs	かえ・る (kae·ru, to return)	い・る (i·ru, to need)
Unigrade verbs	か・える (ka·eru, to change)	いる (iru, to exist)

However, regardless of the dot's position, the inflectional suffix is always the last kana of any unigrade verb.

=== Naive verb classification ===
A caveat of accurately classifying verb groups is that you must have pre-existing knowledge of the verb's negative form. In practice, people tend to learn the verb's plain form first. As such, Japanese language educators usually teach strategies for naive verb classification. Whilst such strategies are not comprehensive, they generally remain useful in the context of regular daily conversations that language beginners will likely encounter. Here is one such strategy:

Step	Verb (plain form)	If yes	If no
1	Is the verb one of the most common exceptions? 要る (iru, to need), 入る (hairu, to enter), 走る (hashiru, to run), 帰る (kaeru, to return, to go home), 切る (kiru, to cut), 知る (shiru, to know), 喋る (shaberu, to talk)	Quinquegrade verb Group 1	Go to Step 2
2	Does the verb suffix rhyme with 〜ぃる (-iru) or 〜ぇる (-eru)?	Unigrade verb Group 2	Go to Step 3
3	Is the verb する (suru, to do) or 来る (kuru, to come)?	Irregular verb Group 3	Quinquegrade verb Group 1

Naive strategies, such as this one, tend to misidentify quinquegrade verbs ending with る (ru)—specifically, when quinquegrade verbs rhyme with 〜ぃる (-iru) or 〜ぇる (-eru). Therefore, when a unigrade verb is concluded from a naive strategy, it is more efficient to confirm the verb's classification in a dictionary. However, there are other rules-of-thumb to more accurately discriminate such verbs.

==== Rules of thumb ====
If a dictionary is unavailable, it becomes difficult to discriminate quinquegrade verbs from unigrade verbs when they rhyme with 〜ぃる (-iru) or 〜ぇる (-eru). The following heuristics aim to improve the accuracy of naive classification:

- There are far more quinquegrade verbs than unigrade verbs.
- Verbs that do not rhyme with 〜ぃる (-iru) or 〜ぇる (-eru) are quinquegrade verbs.

This includes verbs that rhyme with 〜ぁる (-aru), 〜ぅる (-uru) and 〜ぉる (-oru), which are quinquegrade verbs.

- The majority of verbs that rhyme with 〜ぃる (-iru) are unigrade verbs.

70 of the 112 〜ぃる (-iru) common verbs [ca. 62%] listed in JMdict are unigrade verbs. (Note: Calculated using searches of JMdictDB for verbs with "P" frequency, approved, jmdict corpus on 5th May 2025. Godan verb counts: いる 10, きる 14, しる 4, ちる 1, にる 1, ひる 0, みる 0, りる 0, ゐる 0, ぎる 9, じる 3, ぢる ０, びる 0, ぴる 0. Ichidan verb counts: いる 10, きる 7, しる 0, ちる 2, にる 2, ひる 1, みる 9, りる 5, ゐる 0, ぎる 6, じる 21, ぢる 0, びる 7, ぴる 0]].)

- The vast majority of verbs that rhyme with 〜ぇる (-eru) are unigrade verbs.

485 of the 514 〜ぇる (-eru) common verbs [ca. 94%] listed in JMdict are unigrade verbs. (Note: Calculated using searches of JMdictDB for verbs with "P" frequency, approved, jmdict corpus on 5th May 2025. Godan verb counts: える 12, ける 4, せる 4, てる 1, ねる 3, へる 1, める 1, れる 0, ゑる 0, げる １, ぜる 0, でる 0, べる 2, ぺる 0. Ichidan verb counts: える 93, ける 86, せる 32, てる 20, ねる 14, へる 1, める 87, れる 95, ゑる 0, げる 41, ぜる 1, でる 7, べる 8, ぺる 0]].)

Kana and kanji based heuristics for 〜ぃる (-iru) and 〜ぇる (-eru) verbs:

- Verbs written entirely in hiragana are quinquegrade verbs. For example, びびる (bibiru, to be surprised) and のめる (nomeru, to fall forward) are quinquegrade verbs.
- Kanji verbs with 1 okurigana and 3+ syllables are quinquegrade verbs. For example, 契る (chi-gi-ru, to pledge) and 嘲る (a-za-ke-ru, to ridicule) are quinquegrade verbs.
- Kanji verbs with 2 okurigana are usually unigrade verbs. For example, 起きる (okiru, to get up) and 食べる (taberu, to eat) are unigrade verbs.
- Kanji verbs with 2 syllables are inconclusive. For example, 切る (ki-ru) and 見る (mi-ru) are both 2-syllable verbs, yet belong to different categories (quinquegrade and unigrade, respectively)

== Quinquegrade verbs resembling unigrade verbs ==
There are many quinquegrade verbs which may be mistaken for being unigrade verbs in some cases. On the surface, this may seem like a problem that only affects conjugation patterns, since quinquegrade verbs and unigrade verbs conjugate differently. However there are many verbs that, despite having the same spelling, have different meanings and belong to different verb groups. For example:

Quinquegrade verbs	Transcription (Rōmaji)	Unigrade verbs
要る (to need)	iru	居る (to exist)
切る (to cut)	kiru	着る (to put on clothing)
帰る (to go home)	kaeru	変える (to change)
湿る (to be damp/wet)	shimeru	閉める (to close)

When reading verbs such as these, the correct word meaning can be ascertained through the different kanji or accentuation. However, ambiguity is usually removed if the verbs have been conjugated somehow, because different word groups conjugate with slightly varying pronunciations. For example:

Verb conjugation	kiru		kaeru	
Verb conjugation	Quinquegrade verb 切る (to cut)	Unigrade verb 着る (to put on clothing)	Quinquegrade verb 帰る (to go home)	Unigrade verb 変える (to change)
Negative	切らない kiranai	着ない kinai	帰らない kaeranai	変えない kaenai
Polite form	切ります kirimasu	着ます kimasu	帰ります kaerimasu	変えます kaemasu
Potential form	切れる kireru	着られる kirareru	帰れる kaereru	変えられる kaerareru
Volitional form	切ろう kirō	着よう kiyō	帰ろう kaerō	変えよう kaeyō

Since there are so many quinquegrade verbs that resemble unigrade verbs, it is impractical to create or memorize an exhaustive list of words.

== See also ==
- Japanese verb conjugation
- Honorific speech in Japanese
- Japanese adjectives
- Japanese particles
- Japanese grammar
- 五段活用

== Bibliography ==
- Aoki, Hirofumi (2024). "Late Middle Japanese grammar". In Frellesvig, Bjarke; Kinsui, Satoshi (eds.). Handbook of Historical Japanese Linguistics. Handbooks of Japanese Language and Linguistics. De Gruyter. ISBN 978-1-61451-401-5.
- Frellesvig, Bjarke (2010). A History of the Japanese Language. Cambridge: Cambridge University Press. ISBN 978-0-521-65320-6.
- Iwasaki, Shoichi (2001). "Prose and Poetry of Heian Japanese". In Herring, Susan C.; van Reenen, Pieter; Schøsler, Lene (eds.). Textual Parameters in Older Languages. Current Issues in Linguistic Theory. John Benjamins Publishing Company. ISBN 90-272-3702-6.
- Miyagawa, Shigeru (2 December 2019). "Development of Accusative Case Marker". Structure and Case Marking in Japanese. Syntax and Semantics. Academic Press. ISBN 978-0-12-613522-0.
- Vance, Timothy J. (2022). Irregular Phonological Marking of Japanese Compounds. The Mouton NINJAL Library of Linguistics. De Gruyter. ISBN 978-3-11-075501-5.
- Verbeck, Guido Herman Fridolin (1887). A Synopsis of All the Conjugations of the Japanese Verbs. Yokohama: Kelly & Walsh, Limited.
- Vovin, Alexander Vladimirovich (2020). A Descriptive and Comparative Grammar of Western Old Japanese. Languages of Asia Series (2nd ed.). Brill. ISBN 978-90-04-42211-7.
