= Japanese conjugation (ren'yōkei base) =

Element of Japanese language

Japanese conjugation, like the conjugation of verbs of many other languages, allows verbs to be morphologically modified to change their meaning or grammatical function. In Japanese, the beginning of a word (the stem) is preserved during conjugation, while the ending of the word is altered in some way to change the meaning (this is the inflectional suffix). Japanese verb conjugations are independent of person, number and gender (they do not depend on whether the subject is I, you, he, she, we, etc.); the conjugated forms can express meanings such as negation, present and past tense, volition, passive voice, causation, imperative and conditional mood, and ability. There are also special forms for conjunction with other verbs, and for combination with particles for additional meanings.

Japanese verbs have agglutinating properties: some of the conjugated forms are themselves conjugable verbs (or i-adjectives), which can result in several suffixes being strung together in a single verb form to express a combination of meanings.

A revision sheet visually summarizing the conjugations and uses described below

Conjugable words (verbs, i‑adjectives, and na‑adjectives) are traditionally considered to have six possible conjugational stems or bases (活用形, katsuyōkei; literally "conjugation forms"). This article lists those from the continuative base (連用形, ren'yōkei), as well as the euphonic sub-base (音便形, onbinkei).

== Infinitive ==
The infinitive, conjunctive (中止形, chūshikei) or continuative functions as type of adverbial or conjunctive clause. A clause ending in an infinitive is placed before one ending in a conclusive. The infinitive has various meanings that overlap with those of the gerund.

Infinitive form example sentences
| English | Japanese | Function |
|---|---|---|
| I'll just say that if he had been away the project would have become more exact and have gone smoother. | Tada, moshi, kare ga itte itara, keikaku wa mō sukoshi chimitsu ni nari, sumūzu ni yatta darō to itte okimashō (ただ、もし、彼が行っていたら、計画はもう少し緻密になり、スムーズにやっただろうと言っておきましょう) | simple conjoining ("do A, and also do B") |
| The mountains are tall, and the waters pure. | Yama ga takaku, mizu ga kiyoi (山が高く、水が清い) | simple conjoining ("do A, and also do B") |
| What are you saying⁉ I'm always pure and proper‼ | Nani itte 'n no yo! Watashi wa itsu mo kiyoku tadashii wa yo‼ (なにいってんのよ！わたしはいつも清く正しいわよ‼) | simple conjoining ("do A, and also do B") |
| Motoko is taken into the mat-floored room, and ordered to undo her waistband. (Note: She's taken into the room first, then ordered to undo her sash.) | Motoko wa tatami no heya e tsurete ikare, haraobi o toku koto o meijirareru (元子は畳の部屋へ連れていかれ、腹帯を解くことを命じられる) | temporal sequence ("do A, and then do B") |
| Before long summer was over and it became autumn. (Note: Summer passed first, then it became autumn.) | Yagate sono natsu mo sugi aki ni natta (やがてその夏も過ぎ秋になった) | temporal sequence ("do A, and then do B") |
| The game was called off because of rain, what a pity. (Note: The game was called off, so it's a pity.) | Ame de gēmu ga chūshi ni nari, zannen deshita (雨でゲームが中止になり、残念でした) | consequence ("do A, and so do B") |
| There is a small hole in the shoji so that the outside light penetrates. | Sono shōji ni chiisai ana ga aite i, gaikō ga sashiitte iru (その障子に小さい穴が開いてい、外光が差し入っている) | consequence ("do A, and so do B") |
| The shoji paper is rather old and soiled. (Note: It's old, so it's dirty.) | Shōjigami wa kanari furuku, yogorete iru (障子紙はかなり古く、汚れている) | consequence ("do A, and so do B") |
| The older brother became a physician, and the younger a literary scholar. | Ani wa isha ni nari, otōto wa bungakusha ni natta (兄は医者になり、弟は文学者になった) | contrast ("do A, and/but do B") |
| Such rumors centering on the Kremlin are apt to arise at the least little thing, but then they have always ended up as groundless rumors. | Kō shita Kuremurin o meguru ryūsetsu wa, nani ka ni tsukete okoriyasuku, so shite itsu mo ryūsetsu ni owatte kita (こうしたクレムリンを巡る流説は、何かに付けて起こりやすく、そしていつも流説に終わってきた) | contrast ("do A, and/but do B") |
| a beautiful yet sad epic | utsukushiku mo kanashii jojishi (美しくも悲しい叙事詩) | concession ("do A, and yet do B") |
| This year these applications are off to an earlier start than in ordinary years. (Note: Not being in an ordinary year, they're early this year.) | Kotoshi wa kono seishin no deashi ga reinen ni naku hayai (今年はこの申請の出足が例年になく早い) | manner ("do A, and in the process, do B") |
| You end up with a depression if you don't start creating demand by investing new capital. | Sara ni tōshi o shi juyō o tsukuridasanai to fukyō ni natte shimau (更に投資をし需要を作り出さないと不況になってしまう) | instrument ("do A, and by that, do B") |

=== Infinitive: Conjugation table ===
In the domestic tradition of grammar, all inflected words have their own ren'yōkei (連用形), regardless of whether they can stand alone or must be followed by auxiliaries. In western analyses, "infinitives" must be able to stand on their own, and forms with auxiliaries are treated separately. Thus, such forms as ‑mashi‑ (〜まし〜) and deshi‑ (でし〜) are considered ren'yōkei in the native tradition, but not infinitives in western analyses as they cannot be on their own and must be followed by ‑te (〜て) or ‑ta (〜た).

The infinitive forms of the copulae and of adjectives function adverbially without additional auxiliaries just like those of verbs:

- Ame de kyaku ga naku, shōbai wa agattari da (雨で客がなく、商売は上がったりだ; lit. 'It being raining, customers being nonexistent, business is down', transl. Our business is down because nobody's coming because of the rain)

The verb aru, the adjective nai and the particle ‑te are instrumental in expanding copulae's and adjectives' conjugation by fusing with their infinitive forms:

- Imperfective:
  - ni + aru → na(ru)
  - de + aru → de aru → da/ja
  - ‑ku + aru → ‑karu
- Negative:
  - de + nai → de/ja nai
  - de + aran(u)/‑zu → de/ja aran(u)/‑zu
  - ‑ku + nai → ‑ku nai
  - ‑ku + aran(u)/‑zu → ‑karan(u)/‑zu
- Perfective:
  - de + atta → de atta → datta/jatta
  - ‑ku + atta → ‑katta
- Conjectural:
  - de + arō → de arō → darō/jarō
  - ‑ku + arō → ‑karō
- Imperative:
  - de + are → de are
  - ‑ku + are → ‑kare
- Conditional:
  - ni + araba → naraba
  - de + areba → de areba
- Gerund:
  - ‑ku + te → ‑kute
  - ‑ku + atte → ‑katte

Just like how da can be "split", or unfused, back to de (wa) aru, with added particles, the above fused forms can be split, as in Akaku wa atta. (赤くはあった。; lit. 'Being red? It was indeed.').

The particle ‑te itself was once an infinitive form as well, and it combined with aru to make ‑ta and ‑tarō, although the latter of which is increasingly displaced by ‑ta darō or ‑ta deshō.

Unlike verbal infinitive forms which can combine with ‑masu(ru) to make polite forms, as in kakimasu(ru) (書きます(る); 'write'), adjectives use conclusive forms and desu instead, as in akai desu (赤いです; 'be red'), but occasionally also with infinitives and arimasu, as in akaku arimasu (赤くあります). When honorific godan verbs combine with ‑masu(ru), it is more common to drop the consonant r; keeping the r is obsolescent and has a sarcastic, dialectal or archaic connotation.

Apart from the standard ‑ku forms, adjectives also have forms ending in long vowels. They stem from a historical loss of the consonant k, which was complete in conclusive/attributive forms (akaki → akai (赤き→赤い; 'be red'). In infinitive forms, however, such loss was complete only in western dialects; in standard Japanese, it is restricted to formations with gozaimasu (Note: Or less frequently, gozaimasuru, gozarimasu(ru), or even gozaru without the politeness enhancer ‑masu(ru), especially in faux-archaic contexts such as period dramas or kabuki plays.) to make hyper-polite expressions, as in akaku → akō gozaimasu (赤うございます; 'be red'), compared to regularly polite akai desu (赤いです). Western sound changes of this type are obligatory in the affirmative, but optional in the negative, hence akō/akaku gozaimasen (赤う・赤くございません; 'not be red'). In cases where there are triply long vowels, such as ooku → oō (多う), the actual pronunciations may only involve doubly long vowels, as in ō gozaimasu. Cases like yowaku → yo(w?)ō (弱う) are phonetically suspect as to whether there is still a lingering w sound and whether there is a reduction to a doubly long vowel (yo(w)ō gozaimasu or yō gozaimasu (?)). Some of these hyper-polite adjectives have become idioms, such as ohayaku → ohayō (gozaimasu) (おはよう(ございます); lit. 'it's early', 'good morning'), omedetaku → omedetō (gozaimasu) (おめでとう(ございます); lit. 'it's wonderful', 'congratulations'), arigataku → arigatō (gozaimasu) (ありがとう(ございます); lit. 'it's rare', 'it's blessed; it's worthwhile; it's appreciated; thank you'). The sound changes resulting from the historical ‑u ending are usually spelt out in modern kana as shown below, although some historical spellings may still be used sometimes, such as しう instead of しゅう. For beshi (可し), there was such a historical sound change as beku → beu → byō, and byō gozaimasu (べうございます) has been attested.

Like ‑ku, ‑zu can fuse with ‑aru as well to expand its own conjugation (‑zaru, ‑zareba) independent of ‑n(u), though these forms are largely confined to elevated language or cliches like mizaru kikazaru iwazaru (見猿聞か猿言わ猿; 'not seeing, not hearing, not speaking'), manekarezaru kyaku (招かれざる客; 'uninvited guest'), motazaru (持たざる; 'have-not'), irazaru (要らざる; 'uncalled-for', synonymous with iran(u) (要らん・要らぬ)), etc.

| Dictionary form | Pattern | | | Infinitive form |
Godan and pseudo-yodan verbs
| 結う (yuu/yū, fasten) | 結う | 結い | | 結い (yui, fastening) |
| 言(い)う (yū, say) | ゆう | いい | | 言い (ii, saying) |
| 勝つ (katsu, win) | 勝つ | 勝ち | | 勝ち (kachi, winning) |
| 狩る (karu, hunt) | 狩る | 狩り | | 狩り (kari, hunting) |
| 貸す (kasu, lend) | 貸す | 貸し | | 貸し (kashi, lending) |
| 書く (kaku, write) | 書く | 書き | | 書き (kaki, writing) |
| 嗅ぐ (kagu, smell) | 嗅ぐ | 嗅ぎ | | 嗅ぎ (kagi, smelling) |
| 呼ぶ (yobu, call) | 呼ぶ | 呼び | | 呼び (yobi, calling) |
| 読む (yomu, read) | 読む | 読み | | 読み (yomi, reading) |
| 死ぬ (shinu, die) | 死ぬ | 死に | | 死に (shini, dying) |
Honorific godan verbs
| 下さる (kudasaru, give) | 下さる | 下さり | | 下さり (kudasari, giving) |
| 下さる (kudasaru, give) | 下さる | 下さい 下さり | ます(る) | 下さいます(る) (kudasaimasu(ru), give) 下さります(る) (kudasarimasu(ru)) |
| 御座る (gozaru, exist/come) | 御座る | 御座り | | 御座り (gozari, existing/coming) |
| 御座る (gozaru, exist/come) | 御座る | 御座い 御座り | ます(る) | 御座います(る) (gozaimasu(ru), exist/come) 御座ります(る) (gozarimasu(ru)) |
Ichidan verbs
| 見る (miru, look) | 見~~る~~ | 見 | | 見 (mi, looking) |
| 出る (deru, exit) | 出~~る~~ | 出 | | 出 (de, exiting) |
Irregular verbs
| する (suru, do) | す~~る~~ | し | | し (shi, doing) |
| 来る (kuru, come) | く~~る~~ | き | | 来 (ki, coming) |
Adjectives and adjectival auxiliaries
| 無い (nai, be nonexistent) | ない | なく のう | | 無く (naku, being nonexistent) 無う (nō) |
| 少ない (sukunai, be scarce) | 少ない | 少なく 少のう | | 少なく (sukunaku, being scarce) 少のう (sukunō) |
| 弱い (yowai, be weak) | よわい | よわく よおう | | 弱く (yowaku, being weak) 弱う (yoō) |
| 多い (ōi, be abundant) | 多い | 多く 多う | | 多く (ōku, being abundant) 多う (oō) |
| 良い (ii/yoi, be good) | いい よい | よく よう | | 良く (yoku, being good) 良う (yō) |
| 悪い (warui, be bad) | 悪い | 悪く 悪う | | 悪く (waruku, being bad) 悪う (warū) |
| 可愛い (kawaii/kawayui, be adorable) | かわいい かわゆい | かわいく かわゆく かわゆう | | 可愛く (kawaiku/kawayuku, being adorable) 可愛う (kawayū) |
| 大きい (ōkii, be large) | 大きい | 大きく 大きゅう | | 大きく (ōkiku, being large) 大きゅう (ōkyū) |
| 宜しい (yoroshii, be good) | 宜しい | 宜しく 宜しゅう | | 宜しく (yoroshiku, being good) 宜しゅう (yoroshū) |
| 同じい (onajii, be alike) | 同じい | 同じく 同じゅう | | 同じく (onajiku, being alike) 同じゅう (onajū) |
| 可し (beshi, ought/have to) 可き (beki) 可い (bei) | べし べき べい | べく びょう | | 可く (beku, having to) 可う (byō) |
| 如し (gotoshi, be like) 如き (gotoki) | 如し 如き | 如く | | 如く (gotoku, being like) |
| まじ (maji, ought/have not to) まじき (majiki) まじい (majii) | まじき まじい | まじく | | まじく (majiku, having not to) |
Special auxiliaries
| 〜ん (‑n, not) 〜ぬ (‑nu) 〜ず (‑zu) | ん ぬ ず | ん ぬ ず | | 〜ん (‑n, without) 〜ぬ (‑nu) 〜ず (‑zu) |

=== Infinitive: Grammatical compatibility ===
Infinitives allow "splitting", or adding particles like wa or mo between the infinitives and a following verb/adjective to redirect focus. The following verb/adjective is aru/arimasu or nai/arimasen with copulae and adjectives, and suru/shimasu or shinai/shimasen with other verbs. There is a strong tendency to focus on negatives, namely nai/arimasen and shinai/shimasen. In the following examples, the focused information is underlined in the Japanese originals, and in all-caps in the English translations to emulate spoken emphasis.

- de aru / da → de wa aru, de atta / datta → de wa atta, de arimasu / desu → de wa arimasu, de arimashita / deshita → de wa arimashita
  - Katsura da (桂だ; transl. It's KATSURA) → Katsura de wa aru (桂ではある; transl. It IS Katsura)
- de/ja nai → de wa nai, de/ja nakatta → de wa nakatta, de/ja nai desu / arimasen → de wa / ja(a) nai desu / arimasen, de/ja nakatta desu / arimasen deshita → de wa / ja(a) nakatta desu / arimasen deshita
  - Zura ja nai (ヅラじゃない; transl. It isn't ZURA) → Zura de wa nai (ヅラではない; transl. It's NOT Zura)
- ii/yoi → yoku wa aru, yokatta → yoku wa atta, ii/yoi desu → yoku wa arimasu, yokatta desu → yoku wa arimashita
  - Ii (いい; transl. It's GOOD) → Yoku wa aru (よくはある; transl. It IS good)
- yoku nai → yoku wa nai, yoku nakatta → yoku wa nakatta, yoku nai desu → yoku wa nai desu / arimasen, yoku nakatta desu → yoku wa nakatta desu / arimasen deshita
  - Yoku nai (よくない; transl. It isn't GOOD) → Yoku wa nai (よくはない; transl. It's NOT good)
- iku → iki wa suru, itta → iki wa shita, ikimasu → iki wa shimasu, ikimashita → iki wa shimashita
  - Iku (行く; transl. I'll GO) → Iki wa suru (行きはする; transl. I WILL go)
- ikanai → iki wa shinai, ikanakatta → iki wa shinakatta, ikimasen → iki wa shimasen, ikimasen deshita → iki wa shimasen deshita
  - Ikanai (行かない; transl. I won't GO) → Iki wa shinai (行きはしない; transl. I will NOT go)
- suru → shi wa suru, shita → shi wa shita, shimasu → shi wa shimasu, shimashita → shi wa shimashita
  - Sore wa suru (それはする; transl. I'll DO it) → Sore o shi wa suru (それをしはする; transl. I WILL do it)
- shinai → shi wa shinai, shinakatta → shi wa shinakatta, shimasen → shi wa shimasen, shimasen deshita → shi wa shimasen deshita
  - Sore wa shinai (それはしない; transl. I won't DO it) → Sore o shi wa shinai (それをしはしない; transl. I will NOT do it)

Accentually, if a verb is to be accented, all their forms without auxiliaries or particles are minimally accented on the second mora from last, for example, tabe (食べ; 'eat', [tábè] → [tábè wà ɕìnàì]). However, infinitives are capable of being unimoraic, which means they can only be accented on the last and only mora they have. Furthermore, if an unaccented verb is followed by a particle, the particle places an accent on the verb's last mora anyway, resulting in a handful homophonous pairs such as these:

- Unaccented: i (居; 'exist', [ì] → [í wà ɕìnàì])
- Accented: i (射; 'shoot', [í] → [í wà ɕìnàì]); i (鋳; 'cast', [í] → [í wà ɕìnàì])
- Unaccented: ki (着; 'wear', [kì] → [kí wà ɕìnàì])
- Accented: ki (来; 'come', [kí] → [kí wà ɕìnàì])

The infinitive form is also compatible with an extensive list of particles and auxiliaries. Of these, the polite auxiliary ‑masu used to have s-irregular conjugation (サ変格活用, sa-hen katsuyō), whose prototype is the verb suru. As shown elsewhere in this article, unlike suru which has normal eastern shapes and elevated western shapes in Tokyo Japanese, ‑masu retains its western shapes.

- Suru's general shapes: su (Note: Only in su beki.), suru
- Suru's eastern shapes: shinai, shinakatta, shiyō, shiro
- Suru's western shapes: sen (Note: Primarily western. Obsolescent in the east.)/senu (Note: Elevated/faux archaic.), senanda (Note: Western or elevated/faux archaic.), shō (Note: Only western.), seyo/sē/sei
- ‑Masu's general shapes: ‑masu, ‑masuru
- ‑Masu's eastern shapes: ‑mashinai (Note: Functionally obsolete. Probably idiosyncratic in literature.), ‑mashinakatta, ‑mashi
- ‑Masu's western shapes: ‑masen/‑masenu, ‑masenanda, ‑mashō, ‑mase/‑masē/‑masei

Infinitive form: Particle/auxiliary verb example sentences
| Particle/auxiliary | English | Japanese | Conjugation type | Function |
|---|---|---|---|---|
| ni (に) | What have you come to do? | Nani shi ni kita (何しに来た) | particle | in order to do something; before a verb of movement such as iku (行く; 'come') or kuru (来る; 'go') |
| ni (に) | She brought flowers and went to see him during his hospitalization | Kanojo wa hana o motte nyūinchū no kare no mimai ni itta (彼女は花を持って入院中の彼を見舞いに行った) | particle | in order to do something; before a verb of movement such as iku (行く; 'come') or kuru (来る; 'go') |
| ni (に) | "Is it decent that someone such as Madame la Comtesse Bridau de Brambourg, whatsoever faults she may have committed, should go to die in a charity hospital? [...]" | "Buridō do Buranbūru hakushaku fujin to mo nanoru mono ga, tatoe ika hodo no tsumi o okashita ni seyo, jizen byōin ni shini ni mairu yō na koto ga atte, yoroshiki mono de gozaimashō ka. [...]" (「ブリドウ・ド・ブランブウル伯爵夫人とも名乘るものが、たとへいかほどの罪を犯したにせよ、慈善病院に死にに參るやうなことがあつて、宜しきものでございませうか。[...]」) | particle | in order to do something; before a verb of movement such as iku (行く; 'come') or kuru (来る; 'go') |
| ‑gatera (がてら) | I will go for pleasure along with business. | Yōji shigatera asobi ni iku (用事しがてら遊びに行く) | noun-like | while doing something else at the same time |
| ‑nagara (乍ら) | He trembled as he spoke. | Furuenagara hanashita (震えながら話した) | particle | while doing something else at the same time |
| ‑nagara (乍ら) | It's awful of you to not tell me even though you knew. | Shitte inagara oshiete kurenai nan te hidoi ja nai ka (知っていながら教えてくれないなんてひどいじゃないか) | particle | though something else is the case; follows an adjective's imperfective |
| ‑nagara (乍ら) | Though he's young, he's a well-balanced person. | Wakai nagara yoku dekita jinbutsu da (若いながらよくできた人物だ) | particle | though something else is the case; follows an adjective's imperfective |
| ‑tsutsu (つつ) | We stayed up late talking about the old days. | Ōji o kataritsutsu yoru o akashita (往時を語りつつ夜を明かした) | particle | while doing something else at the same time; same as one of the senses of ‑te but more elevated (Note: ‑Tsutsu might have been a duplication of ‑tsu, the original conclusive of the gerundive suffix ‑te. Unlike ‑te and ‑ta, ‑tsutsu does not trigger sound changes when combining with infinitives.) |
| ‑tsutsu (つつ) | He cried, shaking heaven and earth like thunder. | Raimei no yō ni tenchi o ugokashitsutsu kare wa sakenda. (雷鳴の樣に天地を撼かしつゝ彼は叫んだ。) | particle | while doing something else at the same time; same as one of the senses of ‑te but more elevated |
| ‑tsutsu aru (つつ有る) | The economy of our country is improving. | Waga kuni no keiki wa mochinaoshitsutsu aru (わが国の景気は持ち直しつつある) | verb-like; godan | being doing something; same as one of the senses of ‑te iru but more elevated |
| ‑masu (ます) | I'll write you as soon as I get to London. | Rondon ni tsuitara sugu o tegami o kakimasu (ロンドンに着いたらすぐお手紙を書きます) | verb-like; irregular | politeness |
| ‑masu (ます) | Thank you [for what you will do / did]. (Note: What you will do is / have done was precious.) | Arigatō gozaimasu/gozaimashita (ありがとうございます・ございました) | verb-like; irregular | politeness |
| nasaru (為さる; 'do') | It's all right, have as much as you like. | Ii no yo, suki na dake otabenasai (いいのよ、好きなだけお食べなさい) | verb-like; godan | subject exaltation; honorific of suru; can replace suru altogether in compounds |
| nasaru (為さる; 'do') | You'll probably despise me if I say this. | Kō mōshitara osagesuminasaru deshō (こう申したらお蔑みなさるでしょう) | verb-like; godan | subject exaltation; honorific of suru; can replace suru altogether in compounds |
| nasaru (為さる; 'do') | Never mind. | Okamainasaru na (おかまいなさるな) | verb-like; godan | subject exaltation; honorific of suru; can replace suru altogether in compounds |
| nasaru (為さる; 'do') | Don't worry so much. (Note: shinasaru na → shinasan na) | Sonna ni shinpai shinasan na (そんなに心配しなさんな) | verb-like; godan | subject exaltation; honorific of suru; can replace suru altogether in compounds |
| nasaru (為さる; 'do') | You would agree that the United States should be involved in providing aid to these countries. | Gasshūkoku ga korera no kuni no enjo ni sanka su beki da to yū koto ni dōi nasaru deshō (合衆国がこれらの国の援助に参加すべきだということに同意なさるでしょう) | verb-like; godan | subject exaltation; honorific of suru; can replace suru altogether in compounds |
| asobasu (遊ばす; 'let one play; do pleasedly/gladly') | His Highness was pleased to praise him for his achievements. | Denka wa kare no kōseki o ohomeasobashita (殿下は彼の功績をおほめ遊ばした) | verb-like; godan | same as nasaru, but perhaps doing something more gladly; (Note: Asobasu ('cause to play/have fun') is originally the causative of asobu (遊ぶ; 'play/have fun').) similar to be pleased to do or deign to do, or please do in the imperative, in English |
| asobasu (遊ばす; 'let one play; do pleasedly/gladly') | Hark ye; The queen your mother rounds apace: we shall Present our services to a fine new prince One of these days; and then you 'ld wanton with us, If we would have you. | Moshimoshi. Nē, okāsama ga zunzun warūku onariasobasu deshō. De, ima ni, okirei na, shinki no wakagimisama ni, watakushidomo ga omemie o itashimasu no yo. Sō nattara, anata wa watakushidomo to oasobiasobase yo, sō asobase to mōshiagemashitara. (もし〱。[...]ねえ、お母さまがずん〱圓ゥくお成り遊ばすでせう。で、今に、お綺麗な、新規の若君さまに、わたくし共がお目見えをいたしますのよ。さう成ったら、貴下はわたくし共とお遊び遊ばせよ、さう遊ばせと申し上げましたら。) | verb-like; godan | same as nasaru, but perhaps doing something more gladly; similar to be pleased to do or deign to do, or please do in the imperative, in English |
| asobasu (遊ばす; 'let one play; do pleasedly/gladly') | Please look this way. | Kochira o goran asobase (こちらをご覧遊ばせ) | verb-like; godan | same as nasaru, but perhaps doing something more gladly; similar to be pleased to do or deign to do, or please do in the imperative, in English |
| sugiru (過ぎる; 'pass by; exceed') | That metal becomes brittle if it's overheated. | Sono kinzoku wa nesshisugiru to moroku naru (その金属は熱しすぎるともろくなる) | verb-like; ichidan | doing or being something excessively; follows a verb's infinitive, but an adjective's root directly |
| sugiru (過ぎる; 'pass by; exceed') | Too many cooks spoil the soup. | Ryōrinin ga ōsugiru to sūpu ga mazuku naru (料理人が多すぎるとスープがまずくなる) | verb-like; ichidan | doing or being something excessively; follows a verb's infinitive, but an adjective's root directly |
| sugiru (過ぎる; 'pass by; exceed') | Her political theory is too complicated for me. | Kanojo no seiji riron wa watashi ni wa fukuzatsu sugiru (彼女の政治理論は私には複雑すぎる) | verb-like; ichidan | doing or being something excessively; follows a verb's infinitive, but an adjective's root directly |
| hajimeru (始める; 'begin') | The cherry blossoms have started to bloom. | Sakura ga sakihajimete ita (桜が咲き始めていた) | verb-like; ichidan | starting doing something |
| someru (初める; 'begin') | The night began to turn to day. | Yoru ga akesometa (夜が明けそめた) | verb-like; ichidan | starting doing something |
| dasu (出す; 'exit') | Snow began to fall. | Yuki ga furidashita (雪が降りだした) | verb-like; godan | starting doing something |
| kakeru (掛ける; 'initiate') | The banana has started to rot. | Sono banana wa kusarikakete iru (そのバナナは腐りかけている) | verb-like; ichidan | being poised to do something |
| kakaru (掛かる; 'start') | rotten fruit | kusarikakatta kudamono (腐りかかった果物) | verb-like; godan | being poised to do something |
| owaru (終わる; 'end') | I finished eating. | Tabeowatta (食べ終わった) | verb-like; godan | finishing doing something |
| kiru (切る; 'cut; stop') | I haven't finished reading this book. | Kono hon wa mada yomikitte inai (この本はまだ読み切っていない) | verb-like; godan | finishing doing something |
| tōsu (通す; 'pass through') | I read it through to the very end. | Saigo made yomitōshita (最後まで読み通した) | verb-like; godan | doing something thoroughly |
| tsukusu (尽くす; 'endeavor') | I said everything I wanted to say. | Iitai koto wa subete iitsukushita (言いたいことはすべて言い尽くした) | verb-like; godan | doing something thoroughly |
| au (合う; 'meet; match') | At some point, they fell for each other. | Itsu kashira wa futari aishiau yō ni natta (いつかしら二人は愛し合うようになった) | verb-like; godan | doing something together or to/for each other |
| tamau / tamō (給う; 'bestow') | and God forgive me! | Kami yo, yurusasetamae! (神よ、赦させたまへ！) | verb-like; godan | doing something to/for me/us; more archaic/elevated than ‑te kureru and ‑te kudasaru |
| tamau / tamō (給う; 'bestow') | Meanwhile, there were more numerous voices, "Come down from the cross, come down, please get down from the cross!" "Please get down from the cross!" repeated Cinna with despair. "I beg of you, please get down and cure my wife, or else just take my life!" | Sono kan, shuju zatta no koe de, "Jūjika o orite koyo, orite koyo, jūjika o oritamae ya!" "Jūjika o oritamae ya!" to Shinna mo nasakenasa sō na koe de kurikaeshita. "Negawakuba orite waga tsuma o iyashitamae ya, shikarazareba waga seimei o toritamae!" (其間、種々雜多の聲で、 『十字架を降りて來よ、降りて來よ、十字架を降り玉へや！』 『十字架を降り玉へや！』とシンナも情なささうな聲で繰返した。 『願くば降りて我が妻を醫し玉へや、然らざれば我が生命を取り玉へ！』) | verb-like; godan | doing something to/for me/us; more archaic/elevated than ‑te kureru and ‑te kudasaru |
| tateru (立てる; 'erect') | The media gave it too much coverage, so it blew up further. | Masukomi ga kakitateta no de sawagi ga ōkiku natta (マスコミが書き立てたので騒ぎが大きくなった) | verb-like; ichidan | doing something vigorously |
| makuru (捲る; 'roll') | He made calls right and left. | Achi kochi ni denwa o kakemakutta (あちこちに電話をかけまくった) | verb-like; godan | doing something wildly |
| kyōjiru / kyōzuru (興じる・興ずる; 'enjoy') | It's a time for drinking merrily. | Sake o nomikyōjiru no da (酒を飲み興じるのだ) | verb-like; ichidan | enjoying doing something |
| tsuzukeru (続ける; 'continue') | Average temperatures have kept rising for decades here. | Koko sūjūnen heikin kion ga agaritsuzukete iru (ここ数十年平均気温が上がり続けている) | verb-like; ichidan | continuing doing something |
| tsukeru (付ける; 'apply; attach') | This cheese smells bad to those who aren't used to eating it. | Kono chīzu wa tabetsukenai hito ni wa kusai (このチーズは食べつけない人には臭い) | verb-like; ichidan | being used to doing something |
| nareru (慣れる; 'get used to') | He's gotten used to running this marathon course. | Kono marason kōsu wa hashirinarete iru (このマラソンコースは走り慣れている) | verb-like; ichidan | getting used to doing something |
| eru (得る; 'get; can do') | Among people who could write their own names, there likely existed a variety of literate types, ranging from those who could write only their own given names, through those who could adequately read documents written primarily in hiragana, to those who could comprehend the gist of even documents written primarily in kanji. | Jiko no seimei o shirushieru hitobito no naka ni wa, jiko no namae nomi o kakieru hito kara, hiragana shutai no bunsho de areba jūbun ni yomieru hito, kanji shutai no bunsho de mo imi dake wa rikai shieru hito nado ni itaru made, tayō na shikijisha ga sonzai shita to omowareru. (自己の姓名を記し得る人々のなかには、自己の名前のみを書きえる人から、平仮名主体の文書であれば充分に読みえる人、漢字主体の文書でも意味だけは理解しえる人などに至るまで、多様な識字者が存在したと思われる。) | verb-like; ichidan | being able to do something |
| kaneru (兼ねる; 'combine') | Her behavior is incomprehensible. (Note: One cannot explain her behavior.) | Kanojo no gendō wa rikai shikaneru (彼女の言動は理解しかねる) | verb-like; ichidan | being unable to do something |
| kaneru (兼ねる; 'combine') | At Your discretion, I will make amends in person for this transgression incomprehensible even to myself. (Note: Kanuru is the nidan attributive equivalent to the ichidan attributive/conclusive kaneru, used here for literary flair.) | Ooboshimeshi naraba, jishin ni mo geshikanuru kono ayamachi ni tsuki, jikijiki ni mōshiwake o itasu de gozaimashō. (お思召ならば、自身にも解し兼ぬるこの過失につき、ぢきぢきに申し譯を𦤶すで御座いませう。) | verb-like; ichidan | being unable to do something |
| kaneru (兼ねる; 'combine') | I can't afford it at that price. | Sono nedan de wa kaikaneru (その値段では買いかねる) | verb-like; ichidan | being unable to do something |
| kaneru (兼ねる; 'combine') | He's a man who could murder. | Hitogoroshi mo yarikanenai otoko da (人殺しもやりかねない男だ) | verb-like; ichidan | being unable to do something |
| kaneru (兼ねる; 'combine') | If the drought continues at this rate, it may affect the harvest. | Konna ni hideri ga tsuzuku to shūkaku ni eikyō ga dekanenai (こんなに日照りが続くと収穫に影響が出かねない) | verb-like; ichidan | being unable to do something |
| ‑tai (たい) | A self-proclaimed Arab magnate has said he wants to buy this building. | Jishō Arabu no daifugō ga kono biru o kaitai to itte kita (自称アラブの大富豪がこのビルを買いたいと言ってきた) | adjective-like | wanting to do something |
| ‑tagaru (たがる) | The cat's making lots of noise because she wants to get out. | Neko ga soto ni detagatte urusai (猫が外に出たがってうるさい) | verb-like; godan | wanting to do something |
| yasui (易い; 'easy') | It's easier to get advice from my mother than from my father. | Chichi yori haha no hō ga sōdan shiyasui (父より母のほうが相談しやすい) | adjective-like | something being easy to do |
| nikui / katai (難い; 'difficult') | Something hard to say can be written in a letter. | Iinikui koto de mo tegami ni nara kakeru (言いにくいことでも手紙になら書ける) | adjective-like | something being difficult to do |
| nikui / katai (難い; 'difficult') | Passions are hard to control. | Jōyoku wa seishigatai (情欲は制しがたい) | adjective-like | something being difficult to do |
| tsume (詰め; 'end') | My body was quite weary from being kept sitting all day long. | Ichinichijū suwarizume no jōtai de, karada ga taihen tsukareta (一日中座り詰めの状態で、体が大変疲れた) | noun-like | keeping on doing something continuously |
| tōshi (通し; 'passing through') | I was working steadily from early morning, so I am very tired. | Asa hayaku kara hatarakidōshi na no de, taihen tsukareta (朝早くから働き通しなので、大変疲れた) | noun-like | keeping on doing something continuously |
| tōshi (通し; 'passing through') | This child is eating all the time. | Kono ko ga tabedōshi da (この子が食べ通しだ) | noun-like | keeping on doing something repeatedly |
| kachi (勝ち; 'victory') | Young people are prone to go to extremes. | Wakamono wa kyokutan ni hashirigachi da (若者は極端に走りがちだ) | noun-like | being prone to do something |
| kachi (勝ち; 'victory') | She's at the age when you dream a lot. | Yumemigachi na toshigoro na n da yo (夢見がちな年ごろなんだよ) | noun-like | being prone to do something |
| tate (立て) | a freshly bought hat | kaitate no bōshi (買いたての帽子) | noun-like | something having been freshly done |
| kake (掛け) | a half-smoked cigarette | suikake no tabako (吸いかけのたばこ) | noun-like | in the middle of doing something |
| kake (掛け) | I'm halfway through knitting that sweater. | Sono sētā wa mada amikake da (そのセーターはまだ編みかけだ) | noun-like | in the middle of doing something |
| kake (掛け) | On the way back home from school I dropped in at a friend's house. | Gakkō kara no kaerigake ni yūjin no ie ni yotta (学校からの帰りがけに友人の家に寄った) | noun-like | just before doing something |
| ‑shina (しな) | A young fisherman while passing by the side of our boat grabbed the tail of his catch to show us | Hitori no sōnen no ryōshi wa watshitachi no fune no yoko o tōrishina ni emono no o o tsukande miseta (一人の壮年の漁師は私たちの船の横を通りしなに獲物の尾をつかんでみせた) | noun-like | just before doing something |
| sama (様; 'appearance') | Saying this, he turned to the apartment which had lit up. | Kō iizama, akaruku natta zashiki o furimuita (こう言いざま、明るくなった座敷を振り向いた) | noun-like | the way something is done |
| sama (様; 'appearance') | He stabbed someone from behind while running through. | Kakenukezama ni ushiro kara kiritsuketa (駆け抜けざまに後ろから切りつけた) | noun-like | the way something is done |
| kimi (気味; 'tendency') | Prices are tending to rise. | Bukka wa agarigimi da (物価は上がり気味だ) | noun-like | tending to do something |
| shidai (次第; 'order') | We'll contact you immediately when we find what you've lost. | Otoshimono ga mitsukarishidai gorenraku itashimasu (落とし物が見つかり次第ご連絡いたします) | noun-like | as soon as something happens |
| hōdai (放題) | We do what we want and go where we like. | Nan de mo shihōdai doko e de mo ikihōdai da (何でもし放題どこへでも行き放題だ) | noun-like | doing something as much as one likes |
| kagen (加減; 'addition and subtraction; adjustment') | She was standing with her head slightly bowed. | Kanojo wa utsumukikagen de tatte ita (彼女はうつむき加減で立っていた) | noun-like | in the state of doing something |

=== Derivation from the infinitive ===
As a type of verbal stem, the infinitive has been used to derive several categories of words:

- Verbal nouns ("reading", "shooting", etc.): kari (狩り; 'hunting; hunt'), kai (買い; 'buying; sales'), yomi (読み; 'reading'), etc.
- Compound verbs, before a verb: kakikuwaeru (書き加える; 'insert textually'), yomiayamaru (読み誤る; 'misread'), mimawaru (見回る; 'patrol'), etc.
- Compound verbal nouns: kakikuwae (書き加え; 'textual insertion'), yomiayamari (読み誤り; 'misreading'), mimawari (見回り; 'patrol'), etc.
- Compound nouns, before a noun ("reading glasses", "shooting star", etc.): mihon (見本; 'sample'), tabemono (食べ物; 'foodstuff'), kakikotoba (書き言葉; 'written language'), etc.
- Compound nouns, after a noun ("speed reading", "mass shooting", etc.): ushikai (牛飼い; 'cowherd'), shinbun'uri (新聞売り; 'news vendor'), hitokui (人食い; 'man-eating; man-eater; cannibal'), etc.
- Compound nouns, after an adjectival root: tōmi (遠見; 'distant view'), chikazuki (近付き; 'acquaintance'), fukaoi (深追い; 'relentless pursuit'), etc.
- Compound adjectives, before an adjective: minikui (見難い・醜い; 'hard to see; ugly'), utagaibukai (疑い深い; 'deeply suspicious'), etc.

These derivatives above are not arbitrarily derived but idiomatic, except for politeness or subject exaltation with the prefix o‑ (御), in which case verbs can be arbitrarily turned into nouns in the shape of o‑<infinitive>: okotowari shimasu (お断わりします; 'I decline'), oyasumi nasai (お休みなさい; 'good night', lit. 'please rest'), otsukai kudasai (お使いください; 'please [do me a favor and] use'). This nominalization is analogous to the use of the homographic Sino-Japanese prefix go‑ (御) with Sino-Japanese nouns with verbal meanings: gomen nasai (ご免なさい; 'I'm sorry', lit. 'please forgive me'), goshiyō kudasai (ご使用ください; 'please [do me a favor and] use').

== Gerund ==
The gerund, gerundive, conjunctive, or ‑te form (て形, te-kei) is yet another way to make adverbial or conjunctive clauses. It has various meanings that overlap with those of the infinitive, with some restrictions. The ‑te can be thought of as working like the conjunction and in English, with all of its ambiguity. Sometimes the meaning is not as discrete as described in the table below, but quite vague; for example, Mimi de kiite wakaru (耳で聞いてわかる; transl. They make sense upon hearing them with your ears) could be interpreted in a variety of ways: instrument, (Note: By hearing with your ears, you understand them.) temporal sequence, (Note: After hearing with your ears, you'll understand them.) condition, (Note: If you hear them, you'll understand them.) etc.

While the gerund often occurs as a conjunctive clause before a conclusive one, the conclusive clause can sometimes be elliptically omitted. This is especially the case with the favor imperative ‑te kudasai, which is to be abbreviated to ‑te alone, as in Yamete (kudasai) (止めて(ください); 'Please [do me a favor and] stop'). In some cases where the gerund acts as a explanatory nominalized clause before a copula, which is otherwise expressed with the conclusive followed by no da/desu ("it is that"), the omitted part can be thought of as sō (na n(o)) ("it it so; it's like that; things are that way"), hence Ame ga futte (sō) desu (雨が降って(そう)です; = Ame ga futte iru no desu; transl. It's that it's raining; it's raining (so it is so)).

Infinitive form example sentences
| English | Japanese | Function |
|---|---|---|
| They've grown poor in flavor and become expensive. | Mazuku natte takaku narimashita (まずくなって高くなりました) | simple conjoining ("do A, and also do B") |
| Alaska's winters are long and dark. | Arasuka no fuyu wa nagakute kurai (アラスカの冬は長くて暗い) | simple conjoining ("do A, and also do B") |
| Harashima, the protagonist, is a meek and ordinary salaryman employed by a certain travel agency. | Shujinkō no Harashima wa, aru ryokōsha ni tsutomeru sunao de heibon na sararīman de aru (主人公の原島は、ある旅行社に勤める素直で平凡なサラリーマンである) | simple conjoining ("do A, and also do B") |
| Go to the left on that street, and when you get to the end of it, turn right and go straight ahead. | Sono michi o hidari e itte, tsukiatatte, migi e orete, massugu oide nasai (その道を左へ行って、突き当たって、右へ折れて、まっすぐお出でなさい) | temporal sequence ("do A, and then do B") |
| Two years after we started the work she finally comprehended the meaning of what we were doing. | Shigoto o hajimete ninen, kanojo wa yōyaku shigoto no imi o taitoku shita (仕事を始めて二年、彼女はようやく仕事の意味を体得した) | temporal sequence ("do A, and then do B") |
| I borrowed the book and read it. | Hon o karite yonda (本を借りて読んだ) | temporal sequence ("do A, and then do B") |
| Man lives and then dies. (Note: Man is born and then dies.) | Ningen wa umarete shinu mono de aru (人間は生まれて死ぬものである) | temporal sequence ("do A, and then do B") |
| The principle of stocks is that you make money if you buy cheap and sell dear. | Kabu no gensoku wa, yasuku katte takaku ureba mōkaru (株の原則は、安く買って高く売ればもうかる) | temporal sequence ("do A, and then do B") |
| She put on her glasses and had a better look. | Megane o kakete nagamenaoshita (眼鏡をかけて眺めなおした) | temporal sequence ("do A, and then do B") |
| It rained, so we couldn't go. | Ame ga futte ikenakatta (雨が降って行けなかった) | consequence ("do A, and so do B") |
| From New Year's Eve to New Year's Day, there are so many drunks it is a problem | Kure kara shōgatsu ni kakete yopparai ga ōkute komarimasu (暮れから正月にかけて酔っ払いが多くて困ります) | consequence ("do A, and so do B") |
| You'll be surprised at how much time it takes. (Note: It takes so much time it'll surprise you.) | Anmari jikan ga kakatte bikkuri suru deshō (あんまり時間がかかってびっくりするでしょう) | consequence ("do A, and so do B") |
| Excuse me for keeping you waiting. (Note: I made you wait, so it didn't end very much (= I'm sorry).) | Omatase shite dō mo sumimasen deshita (お待たせしてどうもすみませんでした) | consequence ("do A, and so do B") |
| From the appearance of the tracks, it must be a dog. (Note: Looking at the footprints, this must be a dog.) | Ashiato kara mite, kore wa, inu darō (足跡から見て、これは、犬だろう) | consequence ("do A, and so do B") |
| Mr Ogura was such a caring teacher that gave me a lot of generous help in finding a job. | Ogura Sensei wa taihen mendōmi no ii sensei de, shūshoku no sewa nado shinmi ni natte shite kureta (小倉先生は大変面倒見のいい先生で、就職の世話など親身になってしてくれた) | consequence ("do A, and so do B") |
| He was quite a nice dashing young man. (Note: He was a young man who was so dashing it was nice.) | Nakanaka inase de ii wakamono deshita yo (なかなかいなせでいい若者でしたよ) | consequence ("do A, and so do B") |
| I'm so scared of snakes. (Note: Things like snakes are so scary I can't bear it.) | Hebi nan ka ga kowakute tamaranai (蛇なんかが怖くてたまらない) | consequence ("do A, and so do B") |
| It's awfully difficult. (Note: It's so hard it's awful.) | Muzukashikute taihen da (難しくて大変だ) | consequence ("do A, and so do B") |
| He left school and I stayed there. | Kare wa gakkō o satte watashi wa gakkō ni todomatta (彼は学校を去って私は学校にとどまった) | contrast ("do A, and/but do B") |
| He came by car, not by train. | Densha de konai de kuruma de yatte kita (電車で来ないで車でやってきた) | contrast ("do A, and/but do B") |
| I was insubordinate to the boss but was not scolded. (Note: [Even] though I was insubordinate to the boss, I was not scolded.) | Uwayaku ni tatetsuite shikarenakatta (上役に楯突いて叱られなかった) | concession ("do A, and yet do B"), with an elliptically omitted mo (see #Gerund focus) |
| It's even odds at best. (Note: [Even] if it goes well, it's 50-50.) | Umaku itte, gobu-gobu deshō (旨く行って、五分五分でしょう) | concession ("do A, and yet do B"), with an elliptically omitted mo (see #Gerund focus) |
| This room is really hot—always over 30 degrees. | Kono heya wa jitsu ni atsukute itsu mo sanjūdo ijō aru (この部屋は実に暑くていつも三十度以上ある) | proof ("do A, because B is the case") |
| Lacking love man cannot live. (Note: If it lacks love, man cannot live.) | Ai o kaite ningen wa ikiru koto ga dekinai (愛を欠いて人間は生きることができない) | condition ("if you do A, you do B"), with an elliptically omitted wa (see #Gerund focus) |
| If you walk, it takes about 30 minutes. | Aruite sanjippun gurai kakaru (歩いて三十分ぐらいかかる) | condition ("if you do A, you do B"), with an elliptically omitted wa (see #Gerund focus) |
| What's wrong with enjoying sex? (Note: If you enjoy sex, what's bad?) | Sekkusu o tanoshinde nani ga warui (セックスを楽しんで何が悪い) | condition ("if you do A, you do B"), with an elliptically omitted wa (see #Gerund focus) |
| The two slept hand in hand. (Note: The two held hands and slept.) | Futari wa te o toriatte neta (二人は手を取り合って寝た) | manner ("do A, and in the process, do B") |
| Fukuko approaches, stepping on the lawn. | Sono shibafu o funde Fukuko ga yatte kuru (その芝生を踏んで福子がやってくる) | manner ("do A, and in the process, do B") |
| Let's collect weather data and make a weather map. (Note: By collecting meteorological information, let's make a weather map.) | Kishō jōhō o atsumete tenkizu o tsukurō (気象情報を集めて天気図を作ろう) | instrument ("do A, and by that, do B") |
| The hag cast a spell and turned the flower into stone. (Note: By chanting the incantation, the hag turned the flower into stone.) | Yōba wa fushigi na jumon o tonaete hana o ishi ni shita (妖婆は不思議な呪文を唱えて花を石にした) | instrument ("do A, and by that, do B") |
| When repeatedly asked 'Is it that you were carrying guns as a soldier?' they would answer 'Yes, it was as a soldier that I was.' | Heitai to shite, jū o motte desu ka to kasanete tazuneru to, sō desu, heitai to shite desu, to kotaeta (兵隊として、銃を持ってですかと重ねて訊ねると、そうです、兵隊としてです、と答えた) | elliptical nominalization |
| Was your becoming a sumo wrestler the result of people urging you? (Note: You having become a sumo wrestler, is it that you were urged by people?) | Sumō ni natta no wa, hito ni susumerarete desu ka (相撲になったのは、人に勧められてですか) | elliptical nominalization |
| Wait a minute! | Chotto matte (kudasai) (ちょっと待って(ください)) | sentence-ending ellipsis |
| Sorry, I'm late. | Dō mo osoku natte (sumimasen) (どうも遅くなって(すみません)) | sentence-ending ellipsis |
| Pleased to meat you. (Note: I'm beginning and (hajimete) meeting your eyes (me ni kakaru) → I'm meeting you for the first time) | Hajime(mashi)te (ome ni kakarimasu) (初じめ(まし)て(お目に掛かります)) | sentence-ending ellipsis |
| Have you ever been to Karuizawa? (Note: The gerundive atte is here equivalent to the conclusive aru ka.) | Karuizawa ni irashita koto ga atte? (軽井沢にいらしたことがあって？) | (possibly feminine) sentence-ending interrogative substitute for conclusive |
| Got money? Sure. | Kane ga atte? Atte yo (金があって？ あってよ) | (possibly feminine) sentence-ending interrogative substitute for conclusive |
| Is it interesting? (Note: Equivalent to omoshiroi ka.) | Omoshirokatte? (面白かって？) | (possibly feminine) sentence-ending interrogative substitute for conclusive |
| That's the way it is. | Sō na n de (そうなんで) | sentence-ending copular de; perhaps idiosyncratic, old-fashioned, dialectal; OR, to avoid explicitly choosing between desu, de arimasu and de gozaimasu for politeness, without sounding rude with da |
| Oh, it's a joke, see. (Note: Spoken by Shinoyama Kishin.) | Iya, sore wa jōdan de ne (いや、それは冗談でね) | sentence-ending copular de; perhaps idiosyncratic, old-fashioned, dialectal; OR, to avoid explicitly choosing between desu, de arimasu and de gozaimasu for politeness, without sounding rude with da |

=== Gerund: Conjugation table ===
The gerund is created by using the onbinkei base, which is not a distinct "base", but rather the result of consonant and vowel reduction, termed onbin (音便), of the infinitive when followed by the ‑te/‑de (て・で) suffix:

- Sokuonbin (促音便):
  - kaite (買ひて; 'buy') → katte (買って; broadly eastern)
  - kachite (勝ちて; 'win') → katte (勝って)
  - karite (狩りて; 'hunt') → katte (狩って)
- I-onbin (イ音便):
  - kashite (貸して; 'lend') → kaite (貸いて; dialectal)
  - kakite (書きて; 'write') → kaite (書いて)
  - kagite (嗅ぎて; 'smell') → kaide (嗅いで)
- Hatsuonbin (撥音便):
  - yobite (呼びて; 'call') → yonde (呼んで)
  - yomite (読みて; 'read') → yonde (読んで)
  - shinite (死にて; 'die') → shinde (死んで)
- U-onbin (ウ音便):
  - kaite (買ひて; 'buy') → kōte (買うて; broadly western)
  - yobite (呼びて; 'call') → yōde (呼うで; dialectal)
  - yomite (読みて; 'read') → yōde (読うで; dialectal)

‑Te was the infinitive form of the ancient auxiliary tu. It was used to create the perfective auxiliary by fusing with the verb aru: ‑te + aru → ‑ta, which triggers the exact same sound changes as shown here. This was also how the particle ‑tari was formed. It also fused with the copular particle ni: ni + ‑te → de.

For verbs like kau (買う; 'buy'), yū (言う; 'say'), etc., there is a clear preference for sokuonbin in northern and eastern dialects, as in katte (買って), itte/yutte (言って); and for u‑onbin in western and southern dialects, as in kōte (買うて), yūte (言うて). In standard Japanese (eastern), however, there are exceptions where u‑onbin is preferred, such as tōte (問うて; 'inquire'), tōte (訪うて; 'visit'), kōte (請うて・乞うて; 'solicit'), kōte (恋うて; 'long for'), notamōte (宣うて; 'say'), itōte (厭うて; 'grudge'), tamōte (給うて; 'bestow'). These distinctly elevated western forms (Note: Which "carry a certain literary prestige" in Martin's words.) are favored as the verbs themselves are inherently elevated. Non-elevated verbs are less likely to get the western treatment, for example in "Mō tokku ni doko ka e shimikonde shimatta 'rō yo" to notamōta (「もうとっくにどこかへしみ込んでしまったろうよ」とのたもうた) where shimatta (of shimau) remains eastern even though notamōta (of notamau) is westernized. Other examples with u‑onbin, such as ōta (負うた), sōta = sotta (沿うた) have been found as well, and the tendency to use u‑onbin is stronger if the verb stem already contains the vowel o. Some western-Japanese writers such as Orikuchi Shinobu and Oda Sakunosuke (both of whom were Osakan) wrote prose (both narration and dialog) with western forms such as yūte (言うて), ōte (会うて), mōte = matte (舞うて), ushinōte = ushinatte (失うて), sōte = sotte (添うて), etc., while others restrict western forms to only elevated verbs. For the verb yū (言う) in particular, according to two surveys conducted in 2016 and 2017, at least some speakers, particularly female college students from Notre Dame Seishin University, from the western prefecture of Okayama, showed a strong preference for itta n/yutta n (言ったん), even though the broader western public still preferred yūta n, and there was a discreprancy in preference for the said forms and itta no/yutta no/yūta no (言ったの). Further dialectal forms include kaite for kashite (貸して), daite for dashite (出して), magiraite for magirashite (紛らして), yōde for yonde (呼んで) and yonde (読んで), tōde for tonde (飛んで), nōde for nonde (飲んで), etc.

The verb iku/yuku (行く) in particular has the irregular form itte (行って), rather than iite/yuite (行いて). The similarly irregular yutte, as well as the regular iite and yuite, are historically attested in both classical and modern Japanese (see examples below). Additionally, yuite was associated with western dialects, and iite and even ite were recorded in premodern Christian material. It has been hypothesized that the emergence of the eastern itte, which dates from the Muromachi period, and which wound up displacing the other forms (including the once western yuite), was due to a phonetic difficulty in or an aversion to saying iite with any sort of clarity, or a potential confusion with the historical iite (言ひて; 'say'). Nevertheless, the current paradigm bears out that itte (言って) and itte (行って) are still homophonously (consonantally, vocalically and accentually) pronounced [ìtté]. Currently, only itte is recommended, as are ika‑/yuka‑, iki/yuki, iku/yuku, ike/yuke and ikō/yukō. Itte is currently found in the vast majority of dialects, with ite being a sporadic western variant. As for the i‑ and yu‑ stems, while i‑ has been dominant since the Taishō era, yu‑ dominated classical literature of the Meiji era and earlier times, and thus is more elevated.

Adjectival gerunds end in ‑kute, with the infinitive ‑ku. Western infinitives can also combine with ‑te, hence nōte = nakute (無うて), yaritōte = yaritakute (遣りとうて), isogashūte = isogashikute (忙しゅうて), etc. The special sentence-ending use as a question marker permits ‑katte (← ‑ku atte), which otherwise sporadically crops up in the west as an alternative to ‑kute, for example in the Ōgaki dialect; compare the perfective ‑katta (← ‑ku atta). It has been hypothesized that the mainstream, unrestricted ‑kute could have been a mere contraction of *‑ku atte to begin with; there was also ‑kutte as a historical and dialectal alternative.

The auxiliary ‑nai de ("not and") is more common than ‑nakute after verbs, the latter of which is, with few exceptions, not used before subsidiary verbs and adjectives:

- Asagohan o tabenai de gakkō ni kuru ko ga iru (朝ご飯を食べないで学校に来る子がいる; transl. There are children who come to school without eating breakfast)
- Watashi ga ikanai de wa sumanai darō (私が行かないでは済まないだろう; transl. There'll be no end to this unless I go)
- Himitsu o hanasanai de kureta (秘密を話さないでくれた; transl. He didn't tell us the secret in our favor)
- Warawasenai de (kudasai) (笑わせないで(ください); transl. Stop making me laugh)
- Seijika o tokubetsu atsukai ni shinai de hoshii (政治家を特別扱いにしないでほしい; transl. I don't want politicians to be given special treatment)
- Nani mo kakanai de/nakute ii desu ka (何も書かないで・なくていいですか; transl. Is it all right to write nothing?)
- Kanojo wa kare to seikaku ga awanakute rikon shita (彼女は彼と性格が合わなくて離婚した; transl. She didn't get along with him, and they got divorced)
- Sōhō no iibun o kikanakute wa handan o kudasenai (双方の言い分を聞かなくては判断を下せない; transl. I cannot judge without hearing from both sides)
- Anata no yūshoku o tsukuranakute ii to kanojo wa watashi ni itta (あなたの夕食を作らなくていいと彼女は私に言った; transl. She told me I needn't fix dinner for you)

The negative equivalent of atte (あって) is the adjective nakute: (Note: While ないで can also exists alone, it is actually naide (凪いで; 'subside'), not *nai de (無いで).)

- Watashi wa ashi ni jishin ga nakute, minisukāto ga hakenai (私は足に自信がなくて、ミニスカートが履けない; transl. I'm not confident in my legs so I can't wear a miniskirt)
- Tan naru ippanron de wa nakute, kimi jishin no iken o kikitai (単なる一般論ではなくて、君自身の意見を聞きたい; transl. I want to hear your own opinion, not the commonly held view)

After adjectives, only the auxiliary ‑nakute is used:

- Amari amaku nakute jōhin na aji da (あまり甘くなくて上品な味だ; transl. It has a delicate taste without being too sweet)

‑N de, equivalent to ‑nai de, is used mostly by older speakers:

- Hoteru nan ka ni tomaran de, yasumono no heya e tomaru n desu (ホテルなんかに泊まらんで、安物の宿屋へ泊まるんです; transl. We'll stay at cheap inn instead of a hotel or the like)
- Enryo sen de ii. Totte oke yo. (遠慮せんでいい。取っておけよ。; transl. You needn't be shy. Just take it.)
- Nedo, ikan de kure. (ネド、行かんでくれ。; transl. Don't go, Ned.)
- Kaeran de kudasai yo, Pekkusunifu. (帰らんでくださいよ、ペックスニフ。; transl. You mustn't go away, Pecksniff.)

| Dictionary form | Pattern | | | Gerund |
Godan and pseudo-yodan verbs
| 結う (yuu/yū, fasten) | 結う | 結っ 結う | て | 結って (yutte, fasten and) 結うて (yūte) |
| 言(い)う (yū, say) | ゆう | いっ ゆっ ゆう | て | 言って (itte/yutte, say and) 言うて (yūte) |
| 会う (au/ō, meet) | あう おう | あっ おう | て | 会って (atte, meet and) 会うて (ōte) |
| 祝う (iwau/iō, celebrate) | いわう いおう | いわっ いおう | て | 祝って (iwatte, celebrate and) 祝うて (iōte) |
| 紛う (magau/magō, mistake) | まがう まごう | まがっ まごう | て | 紛って (magatte, mistake and) 紛うて (magōte) |
| 給う (tamau/tamō, bestow) | たまう たもう | たもう たまっ | て | 給うて (tamōte, bestow and) 給って (tamatte) |
| 宣う (notamau/notamō, say) | のたまう のたもう | のたもう のたまっ | て | 宣うて (notamōte, say and) 宣って (notamatte) |
| 負う (ou/ō, carry) | 負う | 負っ 負う | て | 負って (otte, carry and) 負うて (ōte) |
| 覆う (ōu/oō, cover) | 覆う | 覆っ 覆う | て | 覆って (ōtte, cover and) 覆うて (oōte) |
| 問う (tou/tō, inquire) | 問う | 問う 問っ | て | 問うて (tōte, inquire and) 問って (totte) |
| 訪う (tou/tō, visit) | 訪う | 訪う 訪っ | て | 訪うて (tōte, visit and) 訪って (totte) |
| 請う (kou/kō, solicit) | 請う | 請う 請っ | て | 請うて (kōte, solicit and) 請って (kotte) |
| 恋う (kou/kō, long for) | 恋う | 恋う 恋っ | て | 恋うて (kōte, long for and) 恋って (kotte) (Note: The authenticity of this particular occurrence is rather dubious. The two other instances of 戀つて in this same edition are meant to be pronounced omotte rather than kotte. Where this edition has 戀つて (kotte), others have 慕つて (shitatte) instead.) |
| 厭う (itou/itō, grudge) | 厭う | 厭う 厭っ | て | 厭うて (itōte, grudge and) 厭って (itotte) |
| 勝つ (katsu, win) | 勝つ | 勝っ | て | 勝って (katte, win and) |
| 狩る (karu, hunt) | 狩る | 狩っ | て | 狩って (katte, hunt and) |
| 貸す (kasu, lend) | 貸す | 貸し | て | 貸して (kashite, lend and) |
| 書く (kaku, write) | 書く | 書い | て | 書いて (kaite, write and) |
| 嗅ぐ (kagu, smell) | 嗅ぐ | 嗅い | で | 嗅いで (kaide, smell and) |
| 呼ぶ (yobu, call) | 呼ぶ | 呼ん | で | 呼んで (yonde, call and) |
| 読む (yomu, read) | 読む | 読ん | で | 読んで (yonde, read and) |
| 死ぬ (shinu, die) | 死ぬ | 死ん | で | 死んで (shinde, die and) |
Irregular godan verbs
| 行く (iku/yuku, go) | いく ゆく | いっ ゆっ い ゆい いい | て | 行って (itte/yutte, go and) 行て (ite) 行いて (yuite/iite) |
Ichidan verbs
| 見る (miru, look) | 見~~る~~ | 見 | て | 見て (mite, look and) |
| 出る (deru, exit) | 出~~る~~ | 出 | て | 出て (dete, exit and) |
Irregular verbs
| する (suru, do) | す~~る~~ | し | て | して (shite, do it and) |
| 来る (kuru, come) | く~~る~~ | き | て | 来て (kite, come and) |
Verbal auxiliaries
| 〜ます(る) (‑masu(ru)) | ます~~(る)~~ | まし | て | 〜まして (‑mashite, and) |
| です (desu, be) | です | でし | て | でして (deshite, be and) |
Adjectives and adjectival auxiliaries
| 〜ない (‑nai, not) 〜なかる (‑nakaru) | ない | ない | で | 〜ないで (‑nai de, not and) |
| 〜ない (‑nai, not) 〜なかる (‑nakaru) | ない | なく のう | て | 〜なくて (‑nakute, not and) 〜のうて (‑nōte) |
| 〜ない (‑nai, not) 〜なかる (‑nakaru) | なかる | なかっ | て | 〜なかって (‑nakatte, not and) |
| 無い (nai, be nonexistent) 無かる (nakaru) | ない | なく のう | て | 無くて (nakute, be nonexistent and) 無うて (nōte) |
| 無い (nai, be nonexistent) 無かる (nakaru) | 無かる | 無かっ | て | 無かって (nakatte, be nonexistent and) |
| 少ない (sukunai, be scarce) 少なかる (sukunakaru) | 少ない | 少なく 少のう | て | 少なくて (sukunakute, be scarce and) 少のうて (sukunōte) |
| 少ない (sukunai, be scarce) 少なかる (sukunakaru) | 少なかる | 少なかっ | て | 少なかって (sukunakatte, be scarce and) |
| 弱い (yowai, be weak) 弱かる (yowakaru) | よわい | よわく よおう | て | 弱くて (yowakute, be weak and) 弱うて (yoōte) |
| 弱い (yowai, be weak) 弱かる (yowakaru) | 弱かる | 弱かっ | て | 弱かって (yowakatte, be weak and) |
| 多い (ōi, be abundant) 多かる (ōkaru) | 多い | 多く 多う | て | 多くて (ōkute, be abundant and) 多うて (oōte) |
| 多い (ōi, be abundant) 多かる (ōkaru) | 多かる | 多かっ | て | 多かって (ōkatte, be abundant and) |
| 良い (ii/yoi, be good) 良かる (yokaru) | いい よい | よく よう | て | 良くて (yokute, be good and) 良うて (yōte) |
| 良い (ii/yoi, be good) 良かる (yokaru) | 良かる | 良かっ | て | 良かって (yokatte, be good and) |
| 悪い (warui, be bad) 悪かる (warukaru) | 悪い | 悪く 悪う | て | 悪くて (warukute, be bad and) 悪うて (warūte) |
| 悪い (warui, be bad) 悪かる (warukaru) | 悪かる | 悪かっ | て | 悪かって (warukatte, be bad and) |
| 可愛い (kawaii/kawayui, be adorable) 可愛かる (kawaikaru/kawayukaru) | かわいい かわゆい | かわいく かわゆく かわゆう | て | 可愛くて (kawaiku/kawayukute, be adorable and) 可愛うて (kawayūte) |
| 可愛い (kawaii/kawayui, be adorable) 可愛かる (kawaikaru/kawayukaru) | 可愛かる | 可愛かっ | て | 可愛かって (kawaikatte/kawayukatte, be adorable and) |
| 大きい (ōkii, be large) 大きかる (ōkikaru) | 大きい | 大きく 大きゅう | て | 大きくて (ōkikute, be large and) 大きゅうて (ōkyūte) |
| 大きい (ōkii, be large) 大きかる (ōkikaru) | 大きかる | 大きかっ | て | 大きかって (ōkikatte, be large and) |
| 宜しい (yoroshii, be good) 宜しかる (yoroshikaru) | 宜しい | 宜しく 宜しゅう | て | 宜しくて (yoroshikute, be good and) 宜しゅうて (yoroshūte) |
| 宜しい (yoroshii, be good) 宜しかる (yoroshikaru) | 宜しかる | 宜しかっ | て | 宜しかって (yoroshikatte, be good and) |
| 同じい (onajii, be alike) 同じかる (onajikaru) | 同じい | 同じく 同じゅう | て | 同じくて (onajikute, be the same and) 同じゅうて (onajūte) |
| 同じい (onajii, be alike) 同じかる (onajikaru) | 同じかる | 同じかっ | て | 同じかって (onajikatte, be the same and) |
Special auxiliaries
| に (ni, being) | に | に | て | にて (nite, be and) |
| に (ni, being) | に | で | | で (de, be and) |
| 〜ん (‑n, not) 〜ぬ (‑nu) 〜ず (‑zu) | ん ぬ ず | ん ぬ ず | で | 〜んで (‑n de, not and) 〜ぬで (‑nu de) 〜ずで (‑zu de) |
| 〜ません (‑masen, not) 〜ませぬ (‑masenu) 〜ませず (‑masezu) | ません ませぬ ませず | ません ませぬ ませず | で でして | 〜ませんで (‑masen de, not and) 〜ませぬで (‑masenu de) 〜ませずで (‑masezu de) 〜ませんでして (‑masen deshite) 〜ませぬでして (‑masenu deshite) 〜ませずでして (‑masezu deshite) |

=== Gerund: Grammatical compatibility ===
==== Gerund focus ====
Just like the infinitive, the gerund, whose ‑te ending is etymologically an infinitive itself, can be followed by a focus particle, such as wa and mo.

With wa ("as for", "speaking of"), the gerund can form a type of conditional clause, with meanings overlapping with such constructions as imperfective + to, provisional ‑eba and conditional ‑tara(ba):

- Yatara ugokimawatte wa tairyoku o shōmō suru dake da (やたら動き回っては体力を消耗するだけだ; transl. If you move around too much, all you'll do is use up your physical energy)
- Kō en'yasu ga susunde wa, endate de kyūryō o morau umami ga naku natta (こう円安が進んでは、円建てで給料をもらううま味がなくなった; transl. With the yen sinking the way it is, the advantage of being paid in yen has gone)
- Byōki de wa menbā kara hazusu hoka nai na (病気ではメンバーから外すほかないな; transl. If he's ill I suppose he'll have to be taken off the roster)
- Watashi o amari ate ni shite wa ikenai (私をあまりあてにしてはいけない; transl. You must not expect too much of me)
- Sensō no kioku o fūka sasete wa naranai (戦争の記憶を風化させてはならない; transl. We must not allow our memories of war to fade away)
- Uso o itte wa dame da (うそを言ってはだめだ; transl. You mustn't tell a lie)

‑Te/‑de wa, can colloquially contract to ‑cha(a)/‑ja(a):

- Nan de gō-kon ni itcha ikenai no? (何で合コンに行っちゃいけないの？; transl. Why can't we go to the mixer?)
- "Dō shite vira ni modotte pūru de oyoija ikenai no?" (「どうして別荘に戻ってプールで泳いじゃいけないの？」; transl. "Why can't we go back to the villa and swim in the pool?")
- "Ikasete yaritai ga, konna ni hito ga ōkucha abunai kara na" (「行かせてやりたいが、こんなに人が多くちゃ危ないからな」; transl. 'I'm sorry, son, but with this crowd it would be far too dangerous.')
- Aite ga inakucha kenka wa dekinai (相手がいなくちゃ喧嘩はできない; transl. You can't squabble without someone to squabble with)

With mo ("even", "too"), the gerund can form a type of concessive clause, with meanings overlapping with such constructions as the classical concessive ‑edo, the imperative concessive ni shiro/seyo and de are, and the tentative concessive with ga and to (mo):

- Karera no kōgekiryoku o motte shite mo ano machi wa otosenai (彼らの攻撃力をもってしてもあの町は落とせない; transl. That town cannot be taken even with their attacking force)
- Ikura kaseide mo ottsukanai (いくら稼いでも追っつかない; transl. No matter how much I work, I can't make ends meet)
- Shiken ga susumu made wa ichijikan de mo oshii (試験が済むまでは1時間でも惜しい; transl. I grudge even a single hour until the examination is over)
- Ōkute mo sukunakute mo ikenai, kichinto jū-guramu o hakarinasai (多くても少なくてもいけない、きちんと10グラムを計りなさい; transl. Measure out exactly 10 grams, and it mustn't be a fraction more or less)

==== Subsidiaries ====
The gerund can precede an extensive list of subsidiary verbs and adjectives (補助動詞・形容詞, hojo dōshi/keiyōshi). Of these subsidiaries, yaru (遣る), ageru (上げる), kureru (呉れる) and kudasaru (下さる), all of which literally mean "give", can be used to convey favors, and their imperative forms when used this way are less terse than those of other verbs. These expressions are similar to "do me a favor and ..." in English, but apart from "do something for somebody" (positively), they can also mean "do something to somebody" (negatively).

The current orthographic convention is to spell subsidiaries only in hiragana to distinguish them from the main verbs or adjectives they derive from. Thus, yonde miru (読んでみる) means "try reading" with miru being a subsidiary verb meaning "try", while yonde(,) miru (読んで(、)見る) means "read and see" with miru being a main verb meaning "see". Mite miru, meaning "try seeing", would be spelt 見てみる rather than 見て見る. Other subsidiaries follow the same principle, such as oite oku (置いておく; rather than 置いて置く), kite kuru (来てくる; rather than 来て来る), itte iku (行っていく; rather than 行って行く), but some verbs like shimau are almost always spelt in kana for simplicity anyway, as in shimatte shimau (しまってしまう).

Phonetically, if the verb before ‑te/‑de is accented, the accent (if any) of the subsidiary verb can be deleted, while that of the main verb can be kept in a separate minor phrase, which begins in a low tone if possible (henceforth, high tones are marked with acutes, low tones with graves, and the accent of a phrase is the high tone immediately before a low tone). Thus:

- 読んでみる "try reading" would be pronounced [jóǹdè mìɾɯ̀] with only one accent and one phrase
- 読んで見る "read and see" would be pronounced [jóǹdè | míɾɯ̀] with two accents and two phrases

Using multiple minor phrases also works with if either or both verbs are unaccented, for example:

- 呼んでみる "try calling" would be pronounced [jòńdé míɾɯ̀] with one phrase
- 呼んで見る "call and see" would be pronounced [jòńdé | míɾɯ̀] with two phrases
- 洗ってしまった "finished washing" would be pronounced [àɾátté ɕímáttá] with one phrase
- 洗ってしまった "washed and put away" would be pronounced [àɾátté | ɕìmáttá] with two phrases

Some of these combinations of ‑te/‑de and a following subsidiary can be colloquially contracted. Notably, while ‑te/‑de iru → ‑te/‑de 'ru and ‑te/‑de ita carry no accent, ‑te/‑de 'te and ‑te/‑de 'ta do:

- 呼んでいる "be calling" would be pronounced [jòńdé íɾɯ́] with no accent
- 呼んでる "be calling" would be pronounced [jòńdé ɾɯ́] with no accent
- 呼んでいた "were calling" would be pronounced [jòńdé ítá] with no accent
- 呼んでた "were calling" would be pronounced [jòńdé tà] with an accent

呼んでない can be either a contraction of 呼んでいない "not be calling", or the negative of 呼んである "have been called":

- 呼んでない "not be calling" would be pronounced [jòńdé náí] with no accent
- 呼んでないか "not be calling?" would be pronounced [jòńdé náì kà] with one accent on the auxiliary adjective ‑nai before a particle
- 呼んでない "not have been called" would be pronounced [jòńdé náì] with one accent on the subsidiary adjective nai

Due to the ambiguity of てない, which could be not only the negative of ‑te aru, but also a contraction of ‑te inai and thus too informal, ‑te inai can be used for both for more consistency in formality:

- Hon o takusan oite iru→‑te 'ru (本をたくさん置いている→てる; They keep a lot of books)
- Hon o takusan oite inai→‑te 'nai (本をたくさん置いていない→てない; They don't keep a lot of books)
- Hon ga takusan oite aru (本がたくさん置いてある; A lot of books are kept)
- Hon ga takusan oite nai/‑te inai (本がたくさん置いてない・ていない; Not a lot of books are kept)

Subsidiaries can be chained together, such as ‑te ite miru, ‑te oite oku, ‑te mite oite shimau, etc.

The various meanings are not as discrete as this table suggests. There is room for interpreting one way or another, and context can help to find the most likely interpretation.

Gerund: Subsidiary example sentences
| Original verb/adjective | te + subsidiary | Colloquial contraction | English | Japanese | Function |
|---|---|---|---|---|---|
| iru (いる・居る; 'exist; be') (Note: Often used to disambiguate the plain imperfective, which ambiguously means "do something regularly" or "will do something once".) | ‑te iru / ‑de iru (ている・でいる) ‑te iru no (da) / ‑de iru no (da) (ているの(だ)・でいるの(だ)) | ‑te 'ru / ‑de 'ru (てる・でる) ‑te 'ru no (da) / ‑de 'ru no (da) / ‑te 'n no (da) / ‑de 'n no (da) / ‑te 'n da / ‑de 'n da (てるの(だ)・でるの(だ)・てんの(だ)・でんの(だ)・てんだ・でんだ) | The cat's holding a fish in her mouth. | Neko ga sakana o kuwaete iru (猫が魚をくわえている) | being doing something right now or at some point in the future |
| iru (いる・居る; 'exist; be') | ‑te iru / ‑de iru (ている・でいる) ‑te iru no (da) / ‑de iru no (da) (ているの(だ)・でいるの(だ)) | ‑te 'ru / ‑de 'ru (てる・でる) ‑te 'ru no (da) / ‑de 'ru no (da) / ‑te 'n no (da) / ‑de 'n no (da) / ‑te 'n da / ‑de 'n da (てるの(だ)・でるの(だ)・てんの(だ)・でんの(だ)・てんだ・でんだ) | What's that guy doin' over there? | Aitsu, anna tokoro de nani yatte 'n da? (あいつ、あんなところで何やってんだ？) | being doing something right now or at some point in the future |
| iru (いる・居る; 'exist; be') | ‑te iru / ‑de iru (ている・でいる) ‑te iru no (da) / ‑de iru no (da) (ているの(だ)・でいるの(だ)) | ‑te 'ru / ‑de 'ru (てる・でる) ‑te 'ru no (da) / ‑de 'ru no (da) / ‑te 'n no (da) / ‑de 'n no (da) / ‑te 'n da / ‑de 'n da (てるの(だ)・でるの(だ)・てんの(だ)・でんの(だ)・てんだ・でんだ) | Whatcha doin'? | Nani yatte 'n no? (何やってんの？) | being doing something right now or at some point in the future |
| iru (いる・居る; 'exist; be') | ‑te iru / ‑de iru (ている・でいる) ‑te iru no (da) / ‑de iru no (da) (ているの(だ)・でいるの(だ)) | ‑te 'ru / ‑de 'ru (てる・でる) ‑te 'ru no (da) / ‑de 'ru no (da) / ‑te 'n no (da) / ‑de 'n no (da) / ‑te 'n da / ‑de 'n da (てるの(だ)・でるの(だ)・てんの(だ)・でんの(だ)・てんだ・でんだ) | Stay in bed! (Note: Or, "Remain being in bed right now!") | Nete inasai (寝ていなさい) | being doing something right now or at some point in the future |
| iru (いる・居る; 'exist; be') | ‑te iru / ‑de iru (ている・でいる) ‑te iru no (da) / ‑de iru no (da) (ているの(だ)・でいるの(だ)) | ‑te 'ru / ‑de 'ru (てる・でる) ‑te 'ru no (da) / ‑de 'ru no (da) / ‑te 'n no (da) / ‑de 'n no (da) / ‑te 'n da / ‑de 'n da (てるの(だ)・でるの(だ)・てんの(だ)・でんの(だ)・てんだ・でんだ) | He loves his wife deeply. | Kare wa tsuma o fukaku aishite iru (彼は妻を深く愛している) | doing, being doing or having been doing something regularly, during a period around the present or in the future |
| iru (いる・居る; 'exist; be') | ‑te iru / ‑de iru (ている・でいる) ‑te iru no (da) / ‑de iru no (da) (ているの(だ)・でいるの(だ)) | ‑te 'ru / ‑de 'ru (てる・でる) ‑te 'ru no (da) / ‑de 'ru no (da) / ‑te 'n no (da) / ‑de 'n no (da) / ‑te 'n da / ‑de 'n da (てるの(だ)・でるの(だ)・てんの(だ)・でんの(だ)・てんだ・でんだ) | I've been kicking back lately. | Saikin wa mainichi hima ni shite iru (最近は毎日暇にしている) | doing, being doing or having been doing something regularly, during a period around the present or in the future |
| iru (いる・居る; 'exist; be') | ‑te iru / ‑de iru (ている・でいる) ‑te iru no (da) / ‑de iru no (da) (ているの(だ)・でいるの(だ)) | ‑te 'ru / ‑de 'ru (てる・でる) ‑te 'ru no (da) / ‑de 'ru no (da) / ‑te 'n no (da) / ‑de 'n no (da) / ‑te 'n da / ‑de 'n da (てるの(だ)・でるの(だ)・てんの(だ)・でんの(だ)・てんだ・でんだ) | Are you still a reporter? (Note: Or, "Are you still doing reporting?") | Mada kisha o yatte 'ru no? (まだ記者をやってるの？) | doing, being doing or having been doing something regularly, during a period around the present or in the future |
| iru (いる・居る; 'exist; be') | ‑te iru / ‑de iru (ている・でいる) ‑te iru no (da) / ‑de iru no (da) (ているの(だ)・でいるの(だ)) | ‑te 'ru / ‑de 'ru (てる・でる) ‑te 'ru no (da) / ‑de 'ru no (da) / ‑te 'n no (da) / ‑de 'n no (da) / ‑te 'n da / ‑de 'n da (てるの(だ)・でるの(だ)・てんの(だ)・でんの(だ)・てんだ・でんだ) | You're already dead! (Note: You have died. → You remain dead.) | Omae wa mō shinde iru! (おまえは もう死んでいる！) | having done something with a persistent result |
| iru (いる・居る; 'exist; be') | ‑te iru / ‑de iru (ている・でいる) ‑te iru no (da) / ‑de iru no (da) (ているの(だ)・でいるの(だ)) | ‑te 'ru / ‑de 'ru (てる・でる) ‑te 'ru no (da) / ‑de 'ru no (da) / ‑te 'n no (da) / ‑de 'n no (da) / ‑te 'n da / ‑de 'n da (てるの(だ)・でるの(だ)・てんの(だ)・でんの(だ)・てんだ・でんだ) | "First, they may or may not know about it. At present, that point is immaterial. Second, whether or not they know about it, it is almost a certainty that they cannot crack it. [...]" (Note: They have('nt) learnt of it. → They remain (un)aware of it.) | "Mazu karera ga zōn ovu fōsu no koto o shitte iru ka dō ka no ten da ga. Genzai de wa, sono koto wa jūyō ja nai. Daini wa, karera wa, zōn ovu fōsu o shitte iru shitte inai ni kakawarazu, kore o yaburu koto wa dekinai koto wa tashika da. [...]" (「まず彼らが力場帯のことを知っているかどうかの点だが。現在では、そのことは重要じゃない。第二は、彼らは、力場帯を知っている知っていないにかかわらず、これを破ることはできないことは確かだ。[...]」) | having done something with a persistent result |
| iru (いる・居る; 'exist; be') | ‑te iru / ‑de iru (ている・でいる) ‑te iru no (da) / ‑de iru no (da) (ているの(だ)・でいるの(だ)) | ‑te 'ru / ‑de 'ru (てる・でる) ‑te 'ru no (da) / ‑de 'ru no (da) / ‑te 'n no (da) / ‑de 'n no (da) / ‑te 'n da / ‑de 'n da (てるの(だ)・でるの(だ)・てんの(だ)・でんの(だ)・てんだ・でんだ) | Your fly is open. (Note: Your fly has opened. → Your fly remains opened. Aku (開く) is intransitive, as in "your fly opens", without an agent performing the act of opening. Its transitive counterpart is akeru (開ける; as in "someone opens your fly") which can be used with te aru.) | Fasunā ga aite 'masu yo (ファスナーが開いてますよ) | having done something with a persistent result |
| iru (いる・居る; 'exist; be') | ‑te iru / ‑de iru (ている・でいる) ‑te iru no (da) / ‑de iru no (da) (ているの(だ)・でいるの(だ)) | ‑te 'ru / ‑de 'ru (てる・でる) ‑te 'ru no (da) / ‑de 'ru no (da) / ‑te 'n no (da) / ‑de 'n no (da) / ‑te 'n da / ‑de 'n da (てるの(だ)・でるの(だ)・てんの(だ)・でんの(だ)・てんだ・でんだ) | The window is shut. (Note: The window has shut. → The window remains shut. Shimaru (閉まる) is intransitive, as in "the window shuts", without an agent performing the act of shutting. Its transitive counterpart is shimeru (閉める; as in "someone shuts the window"), which can be used with te aru.) | Mado ga shimatte iru (窓が閉まっている) | having done something with a persistent result |
| inai (いない・居ない) | ‑te inai / ‑de inai (ていない・でいない) | ‑te 'nai / ‑de 'nai (てない・でない) | I'm not married yet. (Note: I haven't married. → I remain unmarried.) | Kekkon shite inai (結婚していない) | negative of te iru; also negative of te aru and same as te nai below |
| inai (いない・居ない) | ‑te inai / ‑de inai (ていない・でいない) | ‑te 'nai / ‑de 'nai (てない・でない) | I never asked for a vacation, did I? | Rifuresshu shitai nante tanonde 'nai yo ne? (リフレッシュしたいなんて頼んでないよね？) | negative of te iru; also negative of te aru and same as te nai below |
| oru (おる・居る; 'exist; be') | ‑te oru / ‑de oru (ておる・でおる) | ‑toru / ‑doru (とる・どる) | Today there is a special offer. | Kyō wa tokubetsu oyasuku natte orimasu (今日は特別お安くなっております) | same as iru; more deferential in Tokyo Japanese; neutrally alternative to iru in some other dialects |
| oru (おる・居る; 'exist; be') | ‑te oru / ‑de oru (ておる・でおる) | ‑toru / ‑doru (とる・どる) | Pliny of ancient times once said. "Even a bad book is not without merit" | Inishie no Puriniusu Sensei mo notamōte orimasu. "Akusho to iedo, torie ga kaimu to yū koto wa nai" (いにしえのプリニウス先生も宣うております。 「悪書といえど，とりえが皆無ということはない」) | same as iru; more deferential in Tokyo Japanese; neutrally alternative to iru in some other dialects |
| oru (おる・居る; 'exist; be') | ‑te oru / ‑de oru (ておる・でおる) | ‑toru / ‑doru (とる・どる) | "You are rather afraid of me. Do you know what I be?" [...] "Yes." | "Ore ga chitto kowai n da na. Ore no shōbai ga shittoru ka i?" [...] "Shittoru yo" (「おれがちっと恐いんだな。おれの商売が何か知っとるかい？」 [...]「知っとるよ」) | same as iru; more deferential in Tokyo Japanese; neutrally alternative to iru in some other dialects |
| oru (おる・居る; 'exist; be') | ‑te oru / ‑de oru (ておる・でおる) | ‑toru / ‑doru (とる・どる) | "My family keeps nagging me to take it, so I make sure to take it." | "Kazoku ga nome tte urusai kara chanto nondoru" (「家族が飲めってうるさいからちゃんと飲んどる」) | same as iru; more deferential in Tokyo Japanese; neutrally alternative to iru in some other dialects |
| aru (ある・有る・在る; 'exist; be') | ‑te aru / ‑de aru (てある・である) | ‑taru / ‑daru (たる・だる) (Note: In western dialects only. These contractions are rather prone to ambiguity, as ‑tarō could be interpreted as either ‑te arō or ‑ta darō, although ‑te arō is rather elevated for speech, where ‑te aru darō is more likely (see Hortative: Conjugation table for more). ‑Taru/‑daru can also be a contraction of ‑te/‑de yaru below.) | The car is parked on the street. (Note: Someone has stopped the car. → The car remains parked. Tomeru (停める) is transitive, as in "someone stops the car", with an agent performing the act of stopping. Its intransitive counterpart is tomaru (停まる; as in "the car stops"), which can be used with te iru.) | Michi ni kuruma ga tomete aru (道に車が停めてある) | something having been done with a persistent result (Note: This meaning is similar to that of te iru above, but te aru is used to turn normally transitive verbs into intransitive ones with a passive subject and an implied agent.) |
| aru (ある・有る・在る; 'exist; be') | ‑te aru / ‑de aru (てある・である) | ‑taru / ‑daru (たる・だる) | The window is shut. (Note: Someone has shut the window. → The window remains shut. Shimeru (閉める) is transitive, as in "someone shuts the window", with an agent performing the act of shutting. Its intransitive counterpart is shimaru (閉まる; as in "the window shuts"), which can be used with te iru.) | Mado ga shimete aru (窓が閉めてある) | something having been done with a persistent result |
| nai (ない・無い; 'not exist; not be') | ‑te nai / ‑de nai (てない・でない) | | The coat hasn't been paid for. (Note: No one has paid the coat payment. → The coat payment remains unpaid.) | Kono kōto-dai wa mada haratte nai (このコート代はまだ払ってない) | negative of te aru; also replaceable by te inai above |
| gozaru (ござる・御座る; 'exist; be') | ‑te gozaru / ‑de gozaru (てござる・でござる) | | We have an assortment of wine and beer. (Note: We have assembled an assortment of wine and beer. → An assortment of wine and beer remains in stock.) | Wain mo bīru mo kakushu torisoroete gozaimasu (ワインもビールも各種取りそろえてございます) | same as aru; much more polite |
| oku (置く; 'put') | ‑te oku / ‑de oku (ておく・でおく) | ‑toku / ‑doku (とく・どく) | Just leave them there for now. | Mada oite oite kudasai (まだ置いておいてください) | getting something done and leaving it as is |
| oku (置く; 'put') | ‑te oku / ‑de oku (ておく・でおく) | ‑toku / ‑doku (とく・どく) | Let's just hear him out anyway. | Kare no iibun o ichiō kiite okō (彼の言い分を一応聞いておこう) | getting something done anyway |
| oku (置く; 'put') | ‑te oku / ‑de oku (ておく・でおく) | ‑toku / ‑doku (とく・どく) | There's an exam tomorrow, we better get some reading done and get some tapes listened to. | Ashita shiken da kara, yoku hon o yondoitari, tēpu o kiitoitari shitoita hō ga ii (明日試験だから、よく本を読んどいたり、テープを聞いといたりしといた方がいい) | getting something done so there is some result at least |
| oku (置く; 'put') | ‑te oku / ‑de oku (ておく・でおく) | ‑toku / ‑doku (とく・どく) | "I think it's best to store it in the church. Nobody will think of snatching it if we leave it there. We'll put it under the altar and not touch it until we need it." | "Kyōkai ni shimatte oku no ga, ichiban ii to omou n da. Asoko ni oitokeba, dare mo kapparaō nan te omoi ya shinai kara ne. Saidan no shita ni oitoite, hoshiku naru made, te o tsukenai koto ni shiyō" (「教会にしまっておくのが、いちばんいいと思うんだ。あそこに置いとけば、誰も掻っぱらおうなんて思いやしないからね。祭壇の下に置いといて、ほしくなるまで、手をつけないことにしよう」) | getting something done in advance so something else can happen |
| miru (見る; 'look; see') | ‑te miru / ‑de miru (てみる・でみる) | | Have a look at the newspaper. | Shinbun o mite mite (新聞を見てみて) | doing something and seeing/finding out what happens; trying doing something |
| miru (見る; 'look; see') | ‑te miru / ‑de miru (てみる・でみる) | | Give it a shot, I bet you can do it. | Yatte minasai, kitto dekiru yo (やってみなさい、きっとできるよ) | doing something and seeing/finding out what happens; trying doing something |
| miru (見る; 'look; see') | ‑te miru / ‑de miru (てみる・でみる) | | Not knowning what's inside the box, we opened it to find out. | Nani ga haitte iru ka wakaranai no de, hako o akete mita (何が入っているか分からないので、箱を開けてみた) | doing something and seeing/finding out what happens; trying doing something |
| miru (見る; 'look; see') | ‑te miru / ‑de miru (てみる・でみる) | | As someone with parents, I don't get to have that much freedom. | Oya ga atte mireba, anmari jiyū ni wa dekinai (親があってみえれば、あんまり自由にはできない) | once something is seen, experienced or considered |
| miru (見る; 'look; see') | ‑te miru / ‑de miru (てみる・でみる) | | Once I got to Tōkyō, I found it unbearably noisy. | Tōkyō e tsuite mitara, yakamshikute tamaranakatta (東京へ着いてみたら、やかましくてたまらなかった) | once something is seen, experienced or considered |
| goran (ご覧・御覧; 'seeing') | ‑te goran nasaru / ‑de goran nasaru (てごらんなさる・でごらんなさる) | | Try thinking it through. | Yoku kangaete goran (nasai) (よく考えてごらん(なさい)) | same as miru; exalts the subject |
| miseru (見せる; 'show') | ‑te miseru / ‑de miseru (てみせる・でみせる) | | In the latest match against Celta B, he showed off this brilliant free kick. | Chokkin no Seruta Bī-sen de wa, konna azayaka na furī kikku o misete miseta. (直近のセルタB戦では、こんな鮮やかなフリーキックを見せてみせた。) | doing something while showing that to someone |
| miseru (見せる; 'show') | ‑te miseru / ‑de miseru (てみせる・でみせる) | | Let me sing you a song. | Hitotsu utatte miseyō (ひとつ歌ってみせよう) | doing something while showing that to someone |
| shimau (しまう・仕舞う・終う・了う; 'end; put an end to; put/store away') | ‑te shimau / ‑de shimau (てしまう・でしまう) | ‑chimau / ‑jimau / ‑chau / ‑jau (ちまう・じまう・ちゃう・じゃう) | Here's a rocky tract that gets submerged at high tide. | Koko wa ageshio ni naru to kakurete shimau iwaba desu (ここは上げ潮になると隠れてしまう岩場です) | doing something completely or thoroughly |
| shimau (しまう・仕舞う・終う・了う; 'end; put an end to; put/store away') | ‑te shimau / ‑de shimau (てしまう・でしまう) | ‑chimau / ‑jimau / ‑chau / ‑jau (ちまう・じまう・ちゃう・じゃう) | "I've already put away my other clothes, so I'm just layering up now" | "Fuku o shimatte shimatta no de, nan to ka kasanegi o shite kitemasu" (「服をしまってしまったので、なんとか重ね着をして着てます」) | doing something completely or thoroughly |
| shimau (しまう・仕舞う・終う・了う; 'end; put an end to; put/store away') | ‑te shimau / ‑de shimau (てしまう・でしまう) | ‑chimau / ‑jimau / ‑chau / ‑jau (ちまう・じまう・ちゃう・じゃう) | Did you drain all the hot water? | Oyu nuichatta no (お湯抜いちゃったの) | doing something completely or thoroughly |
| shimau (しまう・仕舞う・終う・了う; 'end; put an end to; put/store away') | ‑te shimau / ‑de shimau (てしまう・でしまう) | ‑chimau / ‑jimau / ‑chau / ‑jau (ちまう・じまう・ちゃう・じゃう) | Have you read it all? | Mō yonjatta? (もう読んじゃった？) | doing something completely or thoroughly |
| shimau (しまう・仕舞う・終う・了う; 'end; put an end to; put/store away') | ‑te shimau / ‑de shimau (てしまう・でしまう) | ‑chimau / ‑jimau / ‑chau / ‑jau (ちまう・じまう・ちゃう・じゃう) | I finally got around to seeing that bastard. | Tōtō aitsu ni atte shimatta (とうとうあいつに会ってしまった) | getting around to doing something |
| shimau (しまう・仕舞う・終う・了う; 'end; put an end to; put/store away') | ‑te shimau / ‑de shimau (てしまう・でしまう) | ‑chimau / ‑jimau / ‑chau / ‑jau (ちまう・じまう・ちゃう・じゃう) | Just die already! | Shinjae! (死んじゃえ！) | getting around to doing something |
| shimau (しまう・仕舞う・終う・了う; 'end; put an end to; put/store away') | ‑te shimau / ‑de shimau (てしまう・でしまう) | ‑chimau / ‑jimau / ‑chau / ‑jau (ちまう・じまう・ちゃう・じゃう) | "Shirley! Just waste that idiot emperor already! He's the enemy of women!" | "Shāryi-san! Anna onna no teki na baka kōtei, hinerikoroshichae!" (「シャーリィさん！ あんな女の敵なバカ皇帝、捻り殺しちゃえ！」) | getting around to doing something |
| shimau (しまう・仕舞う・終う・了う; 'end; put an end to; put/store away') | ‑te shimau / ‑de shimau (てしまう・でしまう) | ‑chimau / ‑jimau / ‑chau / ‑jau (ちまう・じまう・ちゃう・じゃう) | I ended up offending her with my poor choice of words. | Iikata ga warukute kanojo o okorasete shimatta (言い方が悪くて彼女を怒らせてしまった) | having ended/wound up doing something |
| shimau (しまう・仕舞う・終う・了う; 'end; put an end to; put/store away') | ‑te shimau / ‑de shimau (てしまう・でしまう) | ‑chimau / ‑jimau / ‑chau / ‑jau (ちまう・じまう・ちゃう・じゃう) | One that was a woman, sir; but, rest her soul, she's dead. | Ikitoru uchi wa onna no hito jatta ga, nanmamidabu, gonete shimaimashita ga na. (生きとる中は女の人ぢゃったが、なんまみだぶ、死ねてしまひましたがな。) | having ended/wound up doing something |
| shimau (しまう・仕舞う・終う・了う; 'end; put an end to; put/store away') | ‑te shimau / ‑de shimau (てしまう・でしまう) | ‑chimau / ‑jimau / ‑chau / ‑jau (ちまう・じまう・ちゃう・じゃう) | Damn it, I left my wallet home! | Shimatta, kamiire oite kichimatta (しまった、紙入れを置いて来ちまった) | having ended/wound up doing something |
| shimau (しまう・仕舞う・終う・了う; 'end; put an end to; put/store away') | ‑te shimau / ‑de shimau (てしまう・でしまう) | ‑chimau / ‑jimau / ‑chau / ‑jau (ちまう・じまう・ちゃう・じゃう) | "She's dead." | "Kanai ga shinjimatta n da na" (「家内が死んじまったんだな」) | having ended/wound up doing something |
| shimau (しまう・仕舞う・終う・了う; 'end; put an end to; put/store away') | ‑te shimau / ‑de shimau (てしまう・でしまう) | ‑chimau / ‑jimau / ‑chau / ‑jau (ちまう・じまう・ちゃう・じゃう) | Oops, I did it again. | Are, mata yatchatta (あれ、またやっちゃった) | having ended/wound up doing something |
| shimau (しまう・仕舞う・終う・了う; 'end; put an end to; put/store away') | ‑te shimau / ‑de shimau (てしまう・でしまう) | ‑chimau / ‑jimau / ‑chau / ‑jau (ちまう・じまう・ちゃう・じゃう) | Whoops, I just spit on you. | A, tsuba ga tonjatta (あ、唾が飛んじゃった) | having ended/wound up doing something |
| shimau (しまう・仕舞う・終う・了う; 'end; put an end to; put/store away') | ‑te shimau / ‑de shimau (てしまう・でしまう) | ‑chimau / ‑jimau / ‑chau / ‑jau (ちまう・じまう・ちゃう・じゃう) | ——I have whined enough already! | ——Watakushi wa mō nakitsukushite shimōta no da! (——わたくしはもう歎き盡してしもうたのだ！) | having ended/wound up doing something |
| shimau (しまう・仕舞う・終う・了う; 'end; put an end to; put/store away') | ‑te shimau / ‑de shimau (てしまう・でしまう) | ‑chimau / ‑jimau / ‑chau / ‑jau (ちまう・じまう・ちゃう・じゃう) | Oh, I've done a sinful thing now. And yet, he's gone with the money, what do I do? | Ā kore de washi 'a tsumibukē koto o yatchimōta da. Sore da no ni, ano hito 'a kane motte itchimatte, dō suru da. (ああこれでわしァ罪深けえことをやつちもうただ。それだのに、あの人ァ金もつて行つちまつて、どうするだ。) | having ended/wound up doing something |
| shimau (しまう・仕舞う・終う・了う; 'end; put an end to; put/store away') | ‑te shimau / ‑de shimau (てしまう・でしまう) | ‑chimau / ‑jimau / ‑chau / ‑jau (ちまう・じまう・ちゃう・じゃう) | Anyutka. If only I could die too. (cries); Mitritch. If you died——you'd only become an outcast from this world! | Anyūtoka Washi mo shinde shimaetara nā. (naku); Mītoritchi Shinjimōtara——Kono yo kara nokemon ni naru dake da! (アニュートカ わしも死んでしまへたらなあ。（泣く） ミートリッチ 死んぢまうたら——此の世から除けもんになるだけだ！) | having ended/wound up doing something |
| shimau (しまう・仕舞う・終う・了う; 'end; put an end to; put/store away') | ‑te shimau / ‑de shimau (てしまう・でしまう) | ‑chimau / ‑jimau / ‑chau / ‑jau (ちまう・じまう・ちゃう・じゃう) | No matter how many times I try to memorize this word, I just keep forgetting it. | Kono tango wa nankai oboete mo wasurete shimau (この単語は何回覚えても忘れてしまう) | ending/winding up doing something (Note: A recent non-past extension of the meaning above.) |
| shimau (しまう・仕舞う・終う・了う; 'end; put an end to; put/store away') | ‑te shimau / ‑de shimau (てしまう・でしまう) | ‑chimau / ‑jimau / ‑chau / ‑jau (ちまう・じまう・ちゃう・じゃう) | When I'm your age, I'll probably forget what I eat yesterday, too. | Ore mo anta gurai no toshi ni nattara, kinō nani o tabeta ka wasurechimau yō ni naru n darō na (俺もあんたぐらいの年になったら，きのう何を食べたか忘れちまうようになるんだろうな) | ending/winding up doing something |
| shimau (しまう・仕舞う・終う・了う; 'end; put an end to; put/store away') | ‑te shimau / ‑de shimau (てしまう・でしまう) | ‑chimau / ‑jimau / ‑chau / ‑jau (ちまう・じまう・ちゃう・じゃう) | He'll drink any goddamn thing. | Nan de mo nonjau (なんでも飲んじゃう) | ending/winding up doing something |
| shimau (しまう・仕舞う・終う・了う; 'end; put an end to; put/store away') | ‑te shimau / ‑de shimau (てしまう・でしまう) | ‑chimau / ‑jimau / ‑chau / ‑jau (ちまう・じまう・ちゃう・じゃう) | What the hell's happening? (Note: Natte shimatte iru no darō → natchatte 'ru n daro → natchatte 'n daro) | Dō natchatte 'n daro (どうなっちゃってんだろ) | ending/winding up doing something |
| sumu (済む; 'end; come to an end; be over') | ‑te sumu / ‑de sumu (てすむ・ですむ) | | I'm managing without a car of my own. | Jikayōsha ga nakute mo sunde iru (自家用車がなくても済んでいる) | getting by on doing something; managing to do something |
| sumu (済む; 'end; come to an end; be over') | ‑te sumu / ‑de sumu (てすむ・ですむ) | | It uses little power thanks to its power-saving design. | Setsudengata na no de denryoku wa sukunakute sumu (節電型なので電力は少なくてすむ) | getting by on doing something; managing to do something |
| sumu (済む; 'end; come to an end; be over') | ‑te sumu / ‑de sumu (てすむ・ですむ) | | You can't just laugh this off. (Note: This won't be over by you laughing at it.) | Sore wa waratte sumu koto de wa nai (それは笑ってすむことではない) | getting off/away with doing something |
| sumu (済む; 'end; come to an end; be over') | ‑te sumu / ‑de sumu (てすむ・ですむ) | | If I turn down the transfer assignment, I won't have to live apart from my family. (Note: I won't live apart and this'll be over. → I'll get away with not living apart.) | Tenkin o kotowareba bekkyo seikatsu o shinai de sumu (転勤を断れば別居生活をしないですむ) | getting off/away with doing something |
| sumu (済む; 'end; come to an end; be over') | ‑te sumu / ‑de sumu (てすむ・ですむ) | | He got off with a warning. (Note: It was a warning, and it was over.) | Kare wa keikoku de sunda (彼は警告ですんだ) | getting off/away with doing something |
| sumanai (済まない; 'isn't over') sumimasen (済みません) | ‑te sumanai / ‑de sumanai (てすまない・ですまない) ‑te sumimasen / ‑de sumimasen (てすみません・ですみません) | | I'm sorry I can't accept your kindness. (Note: I'll waste your kindness and this won't be over. → I won't get away with wasting your kindness.) | Goshinsetsu o hogo ni shite sumanai (ご親切を反古にしてすまない) | feeling sorry for doing something |
| sumanai (済まない; 'isn't over') sumimasen (済みません) | ‑te sumanai / ‑de sumanai (てすまない・ですまない) ‑te sumimasen / ‑de sumimasen (てすみません・ですみません) | | I'm sorry for causing you trouble. (Note: I caused you trouble and this isn't over. → I won't get away with causing you trouble.) | Gomendō o kakete sumimasen (ご面倒をかけてすみません) | feeling sorry for doing something |
| kuru (来る; 'come') | ‑te kuru / ‑de kuru (てくる・でくる) | | He came home from the office. (Note: He came here, which was his home, as he was returning home from his company.) | Kaisha kara kaette kita (会社から帰ってきた) | coming here while also doing something else |
| kuru (来る; 'come') | ‑te kuru / ‑de kuru (てくる・でくる) | | His old mother bade him to come back to her without delay, if it ever mattered to him that she would get an hour of sleep again. | Toshi totta haha wa, moshi haha ga ichijikan no suimin o eru koto ga taisetsu na koto nara, guzuguzu sezu ni haha no moto ni kaette koyo to meijite iru. (年とつた母は、若し母が一時間の睡眠を得ることが大切なことなら、ぐず〲せずに母の許に歸つて來よと命じてゐる。) | coming here while also doing something else |
| kuru (来る; 'come') | ‑te kuru / ‑de kuru (てくる・でくる) | | Worms also often come on Trojan Horses. (Note: It's common that worms also come while riding Trojan Horses.) | Wāmu mo Toroi no Mokuba ni notte kuru no ga futsū da. (ワームもトロイの木馬に乗ってくるのが普通だ。) | coming here while also doing something else |
| kuru (来る; 'come') | ‑te kuru / ‑de kuru (てくる・でくる) | | "[...] Bring me here, with elfin speed, The fragrant philter which I need; Make it sweet and swift and strong; Spirit, answer now my song!" | [...] Koko e, watashi no toko e motte kite kure, ma no hayasa de, Watashi ga nyūyō na, kaoritakai horegusuri o ba. Amaku, tsuyoku, kikime no hayai yō ni chōgō shite kure. Sei yo, iza watashi no uta ni kotaete yo! ([...] 此處へ、私のとこへ持つて來てくれ、魔の速さで、 私が入用な、香り高い惚れ藥をば。 甘く、强く、利き目の速いやうに調合してくれ。 精よ、いざ私の歌に答へてよ！) | coming here while also doing something else |
| kuru (来る; 'come') | ‑te kuru / ‑de kuru (てくる・でくる) | | A shell got him. Came right down on him and his horse. Tore the horse's— I shot the horse myself, poor creature. | Hōdan ni atatta no ja. Maue kara ochite kita hōdan no tame ni uma mo ōkega o shita——kizu tsuita uma wa, washi ga, kono te de uchikoroshita ga, kawaisō na yatsu jatta. (砲弾にあたったのじゃ。真上から落ちてきた砲弾のために馬も大けがをした——傷ついた馬は、わしが、この手で射ち殺したが、かわいそうなやつじゃった。) | coming here while also doing something else |
| kuru (来る; 'come') | ‑te kuru / ‑de kuru (てくる・でくる) | | Go get his ass. (Note: You go to him, give him a beating, then come back here.) | Yattsukete koi (やっつけてこい) | going somewhere else, doing something there, then coming back here (Note: When used for an errand with ‑te/‑de, kuru, which by itself means "come", means "go do something"; while iku, which by itself means "go", means "come do something". English speakers mention the coming or going before the doing of the errand, while Japanese speakers mention the doing of the errand before the coming or going which is expected later. Incidentally, "come" as in "orgasm" is iku, not kuru.) |
| kuru (来る; 'come') | ‑te kuru / ‑de kuru (てくる・でくる) | | I'm leaving. (Note: I'll leave, and come back home later.) | Itte kimasu (行ってきます) | going somewhere else, doing something there, then coming back here |
| kuru (来る; 'come') | ‑te kuru / ‑de kuru (てくる・でくる) | | "My boy, what is this wailing we hear? Go outside and find out, then return and tell me why this unheard-of commotion is taking place." | "Kore, warera no kiku nakigoe wa nan de aru, soto ni dete mite koyo, so shite kono kiita koto no nai sawagi wa, nan no tame ka shiraseyo." (「これ、我等の聽く泣き聲は何である、外に出て見て來よ、そしてこの聽いたことのない騷ぎは、何の爲めか知らせよ」。) | going somewhere else, doing something there, then coming back here |
| kuru (来る; 'come') | ‑te kuru / ‑de kuru (てくる・でくる) | | As the water clears, the bottom becomes visible. —Nothing is becoming visible at all. | Mizu ga sunde kuru to soko ga miete kimasu. —Nan ni mo miete konai na. (水が澄んでくると底が見えてきます。—なんにも見えてこないな。) | sustaining or progressing along up until a point in time |
| kuru (来る; 'come') | ‑te kuru / ‑de kuru (てくる・でくる) | | I told of how I've lived my life | Jibun ga ika ni ikite kita ka o hanashita (自分がいかに生きてきたかを話した) | sustaining or progressing along up until a point in time |
| kuru (来る; 'come') | ‑te kuru / ‑de kuru (てくる・でくる) | | In summer, the sky starts to be lighter when it gets to be four in the morning. | Natsu ni wa asa yoji ni naru to, sora ga shirande kuru (夏には朝四時になると、空が白んでくる) | starting from then on |
| kuru (来る; 'come') | ‑te kuru / ‑de kuru (てくる・でくる) | | My stomach started hurting, so I went to the doctor. | Kyū ni onaka ga itande kita kara, isha ni itta (急におなかが痛んできたから、医者に行った) | starting from then on |
| kuru (来る; 'come') | ‑te kuru / ‑de kuru (てくる・でくる) | | When I left my Tokyo office, I was told that if I called from Ōiso Station, the secretary (at his house) would drive there and pick me up, so I called after half past one. | Tōkyō no ofisu o saru toki, Ōiso-eki kara denwa o sureba (jitaku no) hisho ga kuruma de mukae ni kite kuru to yū koto datta no de, ichiji han ni natte kara denwa o shita. (東京のオフィスを去るとき、大磯駅から電話をすれば（自宅の）秘書が車で迎えに来てくるということだったので、1時半になってから電話をした。) | starting from then on |
| iku / yuku (行く; 'go') | ‑te iku / ‑de iku / ‑te yuku / ‑de yuku (ていく・でいく・てゆく・でゆく) | ‑te 'ku / ‑de 'ku (てく・でく) (Note: ‑Te iki → ‑te 'ki (て行き→てき) is prone to be confused with ‑te ki (て来), although some cases such as ‑te ikitai → ‑te 'kitai (て行きたい→てきたい; /te kitai/) and ‑te kitai (て来たい; /te kitái/) can be distinguished by accent.) | He went home. (Note: He left this place while also returning home.) | Uchi e kaette itta (うちへ帰っていった) | going away while also doing something else |
| iku / yuku (行く; 'go') | ‑te iku / ‑de iku / ‑te yuku / ‑de yuku (ていく・でいく・てゆく・でゆく) | ‑te 'ku / ‑de 'ku (てく・でく) | She walked off alone down the single path through the fields. (Note: She went away while walking down the single path through the fields.) | Kanojo wa hatake no naka no ippon michi o hitori de aruite itta (彼女は畑の中の一本道を一人で歩いていった) | going away while also doing something else |
| iku / yuku (行く; 'go') | ‑te iku / ‑de iku / ‑te yuku / ‑de yuku (ていく・でいく・てゆく・でゆく) | ‑te 'ku / ‑de 'ku (てく・でく) | And when you put your two-year-old on a slide in the United States, they put something on the slide to slow the kid down as he comes down the slide. Not in the Middle East. I put my two-year-old on the slide, ffffff, he took off! | "Amerika no suberidai wa saigo gensoku suru yō ni dekite iru. De mo Chūtō no wa chigau. Musuko ga suberidai o subette tonde 'tta" (「アメリカの滑り台は最後減速するようにできている。でも中東のは違う。息子が滑り台を滑って飛んでった」) | going away while also doing something else |
| iku / yuku (行く; 'go') | ‑te iku / ‑de iku / ‑te yuku / ‑de yuku (ていく・でいく・てゆく・でゆく) | ‑te 'ku / ‑de 'ku (てく・でく) | Did they come and get the laundry? (Note: Did they come here, get the laundry, then go away?) | Sentakumono o totte itta? (洗濯物を取っていった？) | coming here, doing something here, then going away |
| iku / yuku (行く; 'go') | ‑te iku / ‑de iku / ‑te yuku / ‑de yuku (ていく・でいく・てゆく・でゆく) | ‑te 'ku / ‑de 'ku (てく・でく) | 'They've got ... they've got Ron?' (Note: The merpeople came here and took Ron away?) | "Suichūjin ga totte 'tta no wa...... totte 'tta no wa, Ron?" (「水中人が取ってったのは......取ってったのは、ロン？」) | coming here, doing something here, then going away |
| iku / yuku (行く; 'go') | ‑te iku / ‑de iku / ‑te yuku / ‑de yuku (ていく・でいく・てゆく・でゆく) | ‑te 'ku / ‑de 'ku (てく・でく) | Let's eat before leaving. | Tabete ikimashō (食べていきましょう) | coming here, doing something here, then going away |
| iku / yuku (行く; 'go') | ‑te iku / ‑de iku / ‑te yuku / ‑de yuku (ていく・でいく・てゆく・でゆく) | ‑te 'ku / ‑de 'ku (てく・でく) | Old soldiers don't die, they just fade away. | Rōhei wa shinazu, kiete iku nomi (老兵は死なず、消えていくのみ) | sustaining or progressing along from a point in time onward |
| iku / yuku (行く; 'go') | ‑te iku / ‑de iku / ‑te yuku / ‑de yuku (ていく・でいく・てゆく・でゆく) | ‑te 'ku / ‑de 'ku (てく・でく) | The affair dragged on unsettled. | Shigoto wa katazuite ikanakatta (仕事は片付いていかなかった) | sustaining or progressing along from a point in time onward |
| iku / yuku (行く; 'go') | ‑te iku / ‑de iku / ‑te yuku / ‑de yuku (ていく・でいく・てゆく・でゆく) | ‑te 'ku / ‑de 'ku (てく・でく) | It will get colder from now on. | Kore kara samuku natte iku deshō (これから寒くなっていくでしょう) | starting from now on |
| iku / yuku (行く; 'go') | ‑te iku / ‑de iku / ‑te yuku / ‑de yuku (ていく・でいく・てゆく・でゆく) | ‑te 'ku / ‑de 'ku (てく・でく) | Mommy‼ I'll become stone! I'm slowly turning into stone‼ | Mama‼ Boku ishi ni natchau yo Dandan ishi ni kawatte 'ku yo‼ (ママ‼ぼく石になっちゃうよ だんだん石にかわってくよ‼) | starting from now on |
| ikenai / yukenai (行けない; 'can't go') ikemasen / yukemasen (行けません) | ‑te ikenai / ‑de ikenai / ‑te yukenai / ‑de yukenai (ていけない・でいけない・てゆけない・でゆけない) ‑te ikemasen / ‑de ikemasen / ‑te yukemasen / ‑de yukemasen (ていけません・でいけません・てゆけません・でゆけません) | ‑te 'kenai / ‑de 'kenai (てけない・でけない) ‑te 'kemasen / ‑de 'kemasen (てけません・でけません) | No way I could keep on living on my own. | Hitori de wa tote mo ikite ikenai (一人ではとても生きていけない) | it's impossible to keep on doing something |
| ikenai / yukenai (行けない; 'can't go') ikemasen / yukemasen (行けません) | ‑te ikenai / ‑de ikenai / ‑te yukenai / ‑de yukenai (ていけない・でいけない・てゆけない・でゆけない) ‑te ikemasen / ‑de ikemasen / ‑te yukemasen / ‑de yukemasen (ていけません・でいけません・てゆけません・でゆけません) | ‑te 'kenai / ‑de 'kenai (てけない・でけない) ‑te 'kemasen / ‑de 'kemasen (てけません・でけません) | You can't afford not to be strict with how much money and how many connections you get. | Okane to kone o dore dake eru ka, shibia ja nai to yatte 'kenai wa. (お金とコネをどれだけ得るか、シビアじゃないとやってけないわ。) | it's impossible to keep on doing something |
| ikenai / yukenai (行けない; 'can't go') ikemasen / yukemasen (行けません) | ‑te ikenai / ‑de ikenai / ‑te yukenai / ‑de yukenai (ていけない・でいけない・てゆけない・でゆけない) ‑te ikemasen / ‑de ikemasen / ‑te yukemasen / ‑de yukemasen (ていけません・でいけません・てゆけません・でゆけません) | ‑te 'kenai / ‑de 'kenai (てけない・でけない) ‑te 'kemasen / ‑de 'kemasen (てけません・でけません) | "......Mika, you've gotten freakier over the years, haven't you?" "If I hadn't, I wouldn't be able to run a rental store" | "......Mika-chan, nennen, seikaku yugande kitenai?" "Kono kurai de nakya, rentaru-ya no kanrishoku nan ka yatte 'kemasen" (「......ミカちゃん、年々、性格ゆがんできてない？」 「このくらいでなきゃ、レンタル屋の管理職なんかやってけません」) | it's impossible to keep on doing something |
| ikenai / yukenai (行けない; 'can't go') ikemasen / yukemasen (行けません) | ‑te ikenai / ‑de ikenai / ‑te yukenai / ‑de yukenai (ていけない・でいけない・てゆけない・でゆけない) ‑te ikemasen / ‑de ikemasen / ‑te yukemasen / ‑de yukemasen (ていけません・でいけません・てゆけません・でゆけません) | ‑te 'kenai / ‑de 'kenai (てけない・でけない) ‑te 'kemasen / ‑de 'kemasen (てけません・でけません) | You mustn't steal other people's ideas. | Tanin no aidea o nusunde wa ikenai (他人のアイデアを盗んではいけない) | it's prohibited to do something |
| ikenai / yukenai (行けない; 'can't go') ikemasen / yukemasen (行けません) | ‑te ikenai / ‑de ikenai / ‑te yukenai / ‑de yukenai (ていけない・でいけない・てゆけない・でゆけない) ‑te ikemasen / ‑de ikemasen / ‑te yukemasen / ‑de yukemasen (ていけません・でいけません・てゆけません・でゆけません) | ‑te 'kenai / ‑de 'kenai (てけない・でけない) ‑te 'kemasen / ‑de 'kemasen (てけません・でけません) | he who must not be named | namae o itte wa ikenai ano hito (名前を言ってはいけないあの人) | it's prohibited to do something |
| ikenai / yukenai (行けない; 'can't go') ikemasen / yukemasen (行けません) | ‑te ikenai / ‑de ikenai / ‑te yukenai / ‑de yukenai (ていけない・でいけない・てゆけない・でゆけない) ‑te ikemasen / ‑de ikemasen / ‑te yukemasen / ‑de yukemasen (ていけません・でいけません・てゆけません・でゆけません) | ‑te 'kenai / ‑de 'kenai (てけない・でけない) ‑te 'kemasen / ‑de 'kemasen (てけません・でけません) | It's the library's job to answer these questions, and this must be communicated with the younger generations. | Korera ni kotaeru koto ga toshokan no shigoto deari, sore wa wakai sedai ni mo tsutaenakute wa ikemasen. (これらに答えることが図書館の仕事であり、それは若い世代にも伝えなくてはいけません。) | it's prohibited to do something |
| irassharu (いらっしゃる; 'be; come; go') irasshatte / irasshatta (いらっしゃって・いらっしゃった) | ‑te irassharu / ‑de irassharu (ていらっしゃる・でいらっしゃる) ‑te irasshatte / ‑de irasshatte / ‑te irasshatta / ‑de irasshatta (ていらっしゃって・でいらっしゃって・ていらっしゃった・でいらっしゃった) | ‑te 'rassharu / ‑de 'rassharu (てらっしゃる・でらっしゃる) ‑te 'rasshatte / ‑de 'rasshatte / ‑te 'rasshatta / ‑de 'rasshatta / ‑te irashite / ‑de irashite / ‑te irashita / ‑de irashita / ‑te 'rashite / ‑de 'rashite / ‑te 'rashita / ‑de 'rashita (てらっしゃって・でらっしゃって・てらっしゃった・でらっしゃった・ていらして・でいらして・ていらした・でいらした・てらして・でらして・てらした・でらした) | You probably don't remember, but it's me, Satō. (Note: Similar to ‑te inai.) | Tabun oboete irassharanai deshō keredo, watashi, Satō desu (たぶん覚えていらっしゃらないでしょうけれど、私、佐藤です) | same as iru, kuru and iku; ‑te/‑de irassharu is also the same as (de) aru; exalts the subject, and unusable if the subject is not human |
| irassharu (いらっしゃる; 'be; come; go') irasshatte / irasshatta (いらっしゃって・いらっしゃった) | ‑te irassharu / ‑de irassharu (ていらっしゃる・でいらっしゃる) ‑te irasshatte / ‑de irasshatte / ‑te irasshatta / ‑de irasshatta (ていらっしゃって・でいらっしゃって・ていらっしゃった・でいらっしゃった) | ‑te 'rassharu / ‑de 'rassharu (てらっしゃる・でらっしゃる) ‑te 'rasshatte / ‑de 'rasshatte / ‑te 'rasshatta / ‑de 'rasshatta / ‑te irashite / ‑de irashite / ‑te irashita / ‑de irashita / ‑te 'rashite / ‑de 'rashite / ‑te 'rashita / ‑de 'rashita (てらっしゃって・でらっしゃって・てらっしゃった・でらっしゃった・ていらして・でいらして・ていらした・でいらした・てらして・でらして・てらした・でらした) | "No," she said, "we won't have any of this. If she comes in she must see you—and think if she likes there's something wrong! But how can I open the door to her, when she dislikes me—wishes to see not me, but her son? I won't open the door!" (Note: Similar to ‑te kitara, ‑te 'te and ‑te kuru) | "Dame yo" to kanojo wa itta, "Konna koto wa yamemashō. Okāsama ga haitte 'rashitara, anata ni ki ga tsuku ni chigai nai wa——sore ni, katte ni nani ka okashii to omoware de mo shitara! De mo dō shite watashi ga to o akete agerarete? Watashi o kiratte 'rasshatte——watashi ja naku, musuko ni aitagatte 'rassharu no ni. Watashi, doa wa akenai wa" (「だめよ」と彼女は言った、「こんなことはやめましょう。お姑様が入ってらしたら、あなたに気がつくにちがいないわ——それに、勝手に何かおかしいと思われでもしたら！ でもどうしてわたしが戸を開けてあげられて？ わたしを嫌ってらっしゃって——わたしじゃなく、息子に会いたがってらっしゃるのに。わたし、ドアは開けないわ」) | same as iru, kuru and iku; ‑te/‑de irassharu is also the same as (de) aru; exalts the subject, and unusable if the subject is not human |
| irassharu (いらっしゃる; 'be; come; go') irasshatte / irasshatta (いらっしゃって・いらっしゃった) | ‑te irassharu / ‑de irassharu (ていらっしゃる・でいらっしゃる) ‑te irasshatte / ‑de irasshatte / ‑te irasshatta / ‑de irasshatta (ていらっしゃって・でいらっしゃって・ていらっしゃった・でいらっしゃった) | ‑te 'rassharu / ‑de 'rassharu (てらっしゃる・でらっしゃる) ‑te 'rasshatte / ‑de 'rasshatte / ‑te 'rasshatta / ‑de 'rasshatta / ‑te irashite / ‑de irashite / ‑te irashita / ‑de irashita / ‑te 'rashite / ‑de 'rashite / ‑te 'rashita / ‑de 'rashita (てらっしゃって・でらっしゃって・てらっしゃった・でらっしゃった・ていらして・でいらして・ていらした・でいらした・てらして・でらして・てらした・でらした) | "I thought you had been dreaming," (Note: Similar to ‑te 'ta) | "Yume o mite 'rashita n da to omoimashita wa" (「夢を見てらしたんだと思いましたわ」) | same as iru, kuru and iku; ‑te/‑de irassharu is also the same as (de) aru; exalts the subject, and unusable if the subject is not human |
| irassharu (いらっしゃる; 'be; come; go') irasshatte / irasshatta (いらっしゃって・いらっしゃった) | ‑te irassharu / ‑de irassharu (ていらっしゃる・でいらっしゃる) ‑te irasshatte / ‑de irasshatte / ‑te irasshatta / ‑de irasshatta (ていらっしゃって・でいらっしゃって・ていらっしゃった・でいらっしゃった) | ‑te 'rassharu / ‑de 'rassharu (てらっしゃる・でらっしゃる) ‑te 'rasshatte / ‑de 'rasshatte / ‑te 'rasshatta / ‑de 'rasshatta / ‑te irashite / ‑de irashite / ‑te irashita / ‑de irashita / ‑te 'rashite / ‑de 'rashite / ‑te 'rashita / ‑de 'rashita (てらっしゃって・でらっしゃって・てらっしゃった・でらっしゃった・ていらして・でいらして・ていらした・でいらした・てらして・でらして・てらした・でらした) | "Were you dancing with her, Diggory?" (Note: Similar to ‑te ita) | "Sono kata to odotte irashita no, Digori?" (「その方と踊っていらしたの、ディゴリ？」) | same as iru, kuru and iku; ‑te/‑de irassharu is also the same as (de) aru; exalts the subject, and unusable if the subject is not human |
| irassharu (いらっしゃる; 'be; come; go') irasshatte / irasshatta (いらっしゃって・いらっしゃった) | ‑te irassharu / ‑de irassharu (ていらっしゃる・でいらっしゃる) ‑te irasshatte / ‑de irasshatte / ‑te irasshatta / ‑de irasshatta (ていらっしゃって・でいらっしゃって・ていらっしゃった・でいらっしゃった) | ‑te 'rassharu / ‑de 'rassharu (てらっしゃる・でらっしゃる) ‑te 'rasshatte / ‑de 'rasshatte / ‑te 'rasshatta / ‑de 'rasshatta / ‑te irashite / ‑de irashite / ‑te irashita / ‑de irashita / ‑te 'rashite / ‑de 'rashite / ‑te 'rashita / ‑de 'rashita (てらっしゃって・でらっしゃって・てらっしゃった・でらっしゃった・ていらして・でいらして・ていらした・でいらした・てらして・でらして・てらした・でらした) | "About that policewoman you asked to come over..." (Note: Similar to ‑de 'ta) | "Sakki kuruma no naka de koko ni kosaseru yō tanonde 'rashita fukeisan no koto wa......" (「さっき車の中でここに来させるよう頼んでらした婦警さんのことは......」) | same as iru, kuru and iku; ‑te/‑de irassharu is also the same as (de) aru; exalts the subject, and unusable if the subject is not human |
| irassharu (いらっしゃる; 'be; come; go') irasshatte / irasshatta (いらっしゃって・いらっしゃった) | ‑te irassharu / ‑de irassharu (ていらっしゃる・でいらっしゃる) ‑te irasshatte / ‑de irasshatte / ‑te irasshatta / ‑de irasshatta (ていらっしゃって・でいらっしゃって・ていらっしゃった・でいらっしゃった) | ‑te 'rassharu / ‑de 'rassharu (てらっしゃる・でらっしゃる) ‑te 'rasshatte / ‑de 'rasshatte / ‑te 'rasshatta / ‑de 'rasshatta / ‑te irashite / ‑de irashite / ‑te irashita / ‑de irashita / ‑te 'rashite / ‑de 'rashite / ‑te 'rashita / ‑de 'rashita (てらっしゃって・でらっしゃって・てらっしゃった・でらっしゃった・ていらして・でいらして・ていらした・でいらした・てらして・でらして・てらした・でらした) | Hurry up and come down, please! (Note: "Come as you go down, quickly, please!" Similar to ‑te koi.) | Sassa to orite irasshai (さっさと下りていらっしゃい) | same as iru, kuru and iku; ‑te/‑de irassharu is also the same as (de) aru; exalts the subject, and unusable if the subject is not human |
| irassharu (いらっしゃる; 'be; come; go') irasshatte / irasshatta (いらっしゃって・いらっしゃった) | ‑te irassharu / ‑de irassharu (ていらっしゃる・でいらっしゃる) ‑te irasshatte / ‑de irasshatte / ‑te irasshatta / ‑de irasshatta (ていらっしゃって・でいらっしゃって・ていらっしゃった・でいらっしゃった) | ‑te 'rassharu / ‑de 'rassharu (てらっしゃる・でらっしゃる) ‑te 'rasshatte / ‑de 'rasshatte / ‑te 'rasshatta / ‑de 'rasshatta / ‑te irashite / ‑de irashite / ‑te irashita / ‑de irashita / ‑te 'rashite / ‑de 'rashite / ‑te 'rashita / ‑de 'rashita (てらっしゃって・でらっしゃって・てらっしゃった・でらっしゃった・ていらして・でいらして・ていらした・でいらした・てらして・でらして・てらした・でらした) | Come back soon! (Note: "Go, then come back later, please!" Similar to ‑te koi, and the American farewell "Y'all come back now, ya hear!") | Itte( i)rasshai (いって(い)らっしゃい) | same as iru, kuru and iku; ‑te/‑de irassharu is also the same as (de) aru; exalts the subject, and unusable if the subject is not human |
| irassharu (いらっしゃる; 'be; come; go') irasshatte / irasshatta (いらっしゃって・いらっしゃった) | ‑te irassharu / ‑de irassharu (ていらっしゃる・でいらっしゃる) ‑te irasshatte / ‑de irasshatte / ‑te irasshatta / ‑de irasshatta (ていらっしゃって・でいらっしゃって・ていらっしゃった・でいらっしゃった) | ‑te 'rassharu / ‑de 'rassharu (てらっしゃる・でらっしゃる) ‑te 'rasshatte / ‑de 'rasshatte / ‑te 'rasshatta / ‑de 'rasshatta / ‑te irashite / ‑de irashite / ‑te irashita / ‑de irashita / ‑te 'rashite / ‑de 'rashite / ‑te 'rashita / ‑de 'rashita (てらっしゃって・でらっしゃって・てらっしゃった・でらっしゃった・ていらして・でいらして・ていらした・でいらした・てらして・でらして・てらした・でらした) | Take your umbrella with you! (Note: "Go while taking your umbrella with you!" Similar to ‑te ike.) | Kyō wa kasa o motte irasshai (傘を持っていらっしゃい) | same as iru, kuru and iku; ‑te/‑de irassharu is also the same as (de) aru; exalts the subject, and unusable if the subject is not human |
| irassharu (いらっしゃる; 'be; come; go') irasshatte / irasshatta (いらっしゃって・いらっしゃった) | ‑te irassharu / ‑de irassharu (ていらっしゃる・でいらっしゃる) ‑te irasshatte / ‑de irasshatte / ‑te irasshatta / ‑de irasshatta (ていらっしゃって・でいらっしゃって・ていらっしゃった・でいらっしゃった) | ‑te 'rassharu / ‑de 'rassharu (てらっしゃる・でらっしゃる) ‑te 'rasshatte / ‑de 'rasshatte / ‑te 'rasshatta / ‑de 'rasshatta / ‑te irashite / ‑de irashite / ‑te irashita / ‑de irashita / ‑te 'rashite / ‑de 'rashite / ‑te 'rashita / ‑de 'rashita (てらっしゃって・でらっしゃって・てらっしゃった・でらっしゃった・ていらして・でいらして・ていらした・でいらした・てらして・でらして・てらした・でらした) | I envy how you always stay beautiful. (Note: Similar to aru.) | Anata wa itsu mo outsukushikute irassharu kara urayamashii wa (あなたはいつもお美しくていらっしゃるからうらやましいわ) | same as iru, kuru and iku; ‑te/‑de irassharu is also the same as (de) aru; exalts the subject, and unusable if the subject is not human |
| morau (もらう・貰う; 'receive') | ‑te morau / ‑de morau (てもらう・でもらう) | | My raison d'être is only for you to kill me! (Note: My reason for being is only receiving the favor of you killing me!) | Anata ni koroshite morau koto dake ga, watashi no sonzai igi na no! (あなたに殺してもらうことだけが、私の存在意義なの！) | having someone else do something |
| morau (もらう・貰う; 'receive') | ‑te morau / ‑de morau (てもらう・でもらう) | | I had him translate it into English. (Note: I received the favor of him translating it into English.) | Kare ni sore o eiyaku shite moratta (彼にそれを英訳してもらった) | having someone else do something |
| morau (もらう・貰う; 'receive') | ‑te morau / ‑de morau (てもらう・でもらう) | | You'd better write Mrs. Tarleton about that, too. (Note: I want to receive the favor of you giving Mrs. Tarleton the favor of you writing to her.) | Omae kara, Tāruton Fujin ni, sono koto o kaite yatte moraitai. (おまえから、タールトン夫人に、そのことを書いてやってもらいたい。) | having someone else do something |
| morau (もらう・貰う; 'receive') | ‑te morau / ‑de morau (てもらう・でもらう) | | "I took the liberty of waiting for you." (Note: I received the favor of you letting me wait. → I assumed you would've been okay with me waiting.) | "Matasete moratte imashita" (「待たせてもらっていました」) | after a causative, taking the liberty of doing something (Note: This expression has been criticized as "obsequious". "I'll receive the favor of you letting me do it" is a just a more circumlocutory way to say "I'll do it" with assumed permission from someone else. This may have the same force as "I'll take the liberty of doing it" or "I'll go ahead and do it" in English.) |
| morau (もらう・貰う; 'receive') | ‑te morau / ‑de morau (てもらう・でもらう) | | How about eating with me sometime soon? Let me treat you. I'll get in touch with you before long. (Note: I'll receive the favor of you letting me treat you. → I'm assuming you'll be okay with me treating you.) | Chikaku meshi de mo kuwanai ka. Ogorashite morau yo. Izure renraku suru. (近く飯でも食わないか。おごらしてもらうよ。いずれ連絡する。) | after a causative, taking the liberty of doing something |
| itadaku (頂く; 'receive') | ‑te itadaku / ‑de itadaku (ていただく・でいただく) | ‑te 'tadaku / ‑de 'tadaku (てただく・でただく) | I was honored to feast my eyes upon his prized antique china. (Note: I got an eyeful as I received the favor of him showing his prized antique china to me.) | Kare no hizō no kotōki o misete itadaku to yū ganpuku o emashita (彼の秘蔵の古陶器を見せていただくという眼福を得ました) | same as morau; more polite |
| itadaku (頂く; 'receive') | ‑te itadaku / ‑de itadaku (ていただく・でいただく) | ‑te 'tadaku / ‑de 'tadaku (てただく・でただく) | "Well then, sire, pray take my life. I'd gladly rather be killed than suffer sorrow like this." (Note: Me receiving the favor of ye having killed me would be more enjoyable than suffering sorrow like this.) | "De wa, dō ka, watashi no inochi o omeshi ni nasutte kudasaimashi. Watashi wa, konna kanashii omoi o itashimasu yori wa, isso koroshite itadaita hō ga, yoppodo shiawase de gozaimasu." (「では、どうか、わたしの命をお召しになすってくださいまし。わたしは、こんな悲しい思いをいたしますよりは、いっそ殺していただいた方が、よっぽど仕合わせでございます。」) | same as morau; more polite |
| itadaku (頂く; 'receive') | ‑te itadaku / ‑de itadaku (ていただく・でいただく) | ‑te 'tadaku / ‑de 'tadaku (てただく・でただく) | I asked the parents whether they might not let their son take our daughter's hand in marriage. (Note: The parents might give their son a favor (moratte yatte) to marry our daughter, and we might not receive their favor (moratte yatte itadakenai) if they don't do that.) | Oya ni sono musuko ni uchi no musume o moratte yatte itadakenai to ka tanonda (親にその息子にうちの娘を貰ってやっていただけないとか頼んだ) | same as morau; more polite |
| itadaku (頂く; 'receive') | ‑te itadaku / ‑de itadaku (ていただく・でいただく) | ‑te 'tadaku / ‑de 'tadaku (てただく・でただく) | To get even more people to take advantage of it, the Sea Girl Bus will undergo changes from the 1st of October. (Note: For us to receive the favor of even more people using the bus.) | Mada mada ōku no minnasan ni riyō shite 'tadaku tame, jūgatsu tsuitachi kara Umikko Basu ga kawarimasu. (まだまだ多くのみなさんに利用してただくため、10月1日から海っ子バスが変わります。) | same as morau; more polite |
| itadaku (頂く; 'receive') | ‑te itadaku / ‑de itadaku (ていただく・でいただく) | ‑te 'tadaku / ‑de 'tadaku (てただく・でただく) | May I bring my little brother along? (Note: Won't I receive the favor of you letting me bring my little brother along?) | Otōto o tsurete kosasete itadakemasen ka (弟を連れてこさせていただけませんか) | same as morau; more polite |
| itadaku (頂く; 'receive') | ‑te itadaku / ‑de itadaku (ていただく・でいただく) | ‑te 'tadaku / ‑de 'tadaku (てただく・でただく) | I will take the liberty to be in attendance. (Note: I will receive the favor of you letting me be in attendance.) | Shusseki sasete itadakimasu (出席させていただきます) | same as morau; more polite |
| yaru (やる・遣る; 'give (to someone other than me/us); do') | ‑te yaru / ‑de yaru (てやる・でやる) | ‑taru / ‑daru (たる・だる) (Note: Probably dialectal. Also western-only contractions for ‑te/‑de aru above.) | “I’ll kill you all. I’ll kill you all. I’ll kill you. I’ll kill your family. I’ll kill all your sons, daughters and grandchildren, so help me. I’ll rid this earth of every one of your descendants.” | “Koroshite yaru. Koroshite yaru. Omae o koroshite yaru. Omae no kazoku o koroshite yaru. Omae no musuko o, omae no musume o, omae no mago o, kanarazu kitto, zettai ni koroshite yaru. Omae no chi o hiku subete no mono o, kono chijō kara keshisatte yaru” (「殺してやる。殺してやる。お前を殺してやる。お前の家族を殺してやる。お前の息子を、お前の娘を、お前の孫を、必ずきっと、絶対に殺してやる。お前の血を引く全ての者を、この地上から消し去ってやる」) | doing something to/for someone other than me/us |
| yaru (やる・遣る; 'give (to someone other than me/us); do') | ‑te yaru / ‑de yaru (てやる・でやる) | ‑taru / ‑daru (たる・だる) | I’ll wipe them off‼ Off this world… Those pests… Every single one‼ | Kuchiku shite yaru‼ Kono yo kara… ippiki… nokorazu‼ (駆逐してやる‼ この世から… 一匹… 残らず‼) | doing something to/for someone other than me/us |
| yaru (やる・遣る; 'give (to someone other than me/us); do') | ‑te yaru / ‑de yaru (てやる・でやる) | ‑taru / ‑daru (たる・だる) | I'll handle it for you. | Boku ga umaku yatte yaru yo (僕がうまくやってやるよ) | doing something to/for someone other than me/us |
| yaru (やる・遣る; 'give (to someone other than me/us); do') | ‑te yaru / ‑de yaru (てやる・でやる) | ‑taru / ‑daru (たる・だる) | If they have something to say, let them say it. | Iitai koto ga aru nara iwasete yare (言いたいことがあるなら言わせてやれ) | doing something to/for someone other than me/us |
| yaru (やる・遣る; 'give (to someone other than me/us); do') | ‑te yaru / ‑de yaru (てやる・でやる) | ‑taru / ‑daru (たる・だる) | Come hang out at my place. I'll show ya some good fun. | Ore n toko ni asobi ni koi ya. Omoshiroi asobi mo oshietaru. (俺んとこに遊びに来いや。面白い遊びも教えたる。 (Note: These sentences were reportedly spoken by a young man from the Noto Peninsula.)) | doing something to/for someone other than me/us |
| yaru (やる・遣る; 'give (to someone other than me/us); do') | ‑te yaru / ‑de yaru (てやる・でやる) | ‑taru / ‑daru (たる・だる) | I love her! I love Shizuka more than anything in the world! I'd rather die for her than let you take me away‼ | Aishite 'ru n ya Boku wa Shizuka o sekaiichi aishite iru n yah Omae ni torareru kurai nara shindaru wa i‼ (愛してるんや ボクは静香を世界一愛しているんやッ お前に取られるくらいなら死んだるわい‼) | doing something to/for someone other than me/us |
| ageru (上げる; 'raise; give (to someone other than me/us)') | ‑te ageru / ‑de ageru (てあげる・であげる) | ‑tageru / ‑dageru (たげる・だげる) | "Your magic has the power to warp the world. Unfortunately, even with my current power, I cannot kill you." | "Anata no mahō wa, sekai o yugameru chikara. Zannen nagara, ima no watashi no chikara de mo, anata o koroshite ageru koto wa dekinai wa" (「あなたの魔法は、世界を歪める力。残念ながら、今のわたしの力でも、あなたを殺してあげることはできないわ」) | doing something to/for someone other than me/us |
| ageru (上げる; 'raise; give (to someone other than me/us)') | ‑te ageru / ‑de ageru (てあげる・であげる) | ‑tageru / ‑dageru (たげる・だげる) | Let me help you put your shoes on. | Kutsu o hakasete ageyō (靴をはかせてあげよう) | doing something to/for someone other than me/us |
| ageru (上げる; 'raise; give (to someone other than me/us)') | ‑te ageru / ‑de ageru (てあげる・であげる) | ‑tageru / ‑dageru (たげる・だげる) | I'll even pay your tuition fees. | Gakuhi mo dashitageru (学費も出したげる) | doing something to/for someone other than me/us |
| ageru (上げる; 'raise; give (to someone other than me/us)') | ‑te ageru / ‑de ageru (てあげる・であげる) | ‑tageru / ‑dageru (たげる・だげる) | I'll read it for ya. It says "Ieyasu's gonna attack Osaka again." Oh, no! | Atashi ga yondageru wa "Mata mo ya Ieyasu ga Ōsaka" desu tte yo Ara mā! (あたしが読んだげるわ 「またもや家康が大坂を攻撃」ですってよ あらまア！) | doing something to/for someone other than me/us |
| tsukawasu (遣わす; 'give (to someone other than me/us)') | ‑te tsukawasu / ‑de tsukawasu (てつかわす・でつかわす) | | I forgive you. | Yurushite tsukawasu (許してつかわす) | doing something to/for someone other than me/us |
| tsukawasu (遣わす; 'give (to someone other than me/us)') | ‑te tsukawasu / ‑de tsukawasu (てつかわす・でつかわす) | | These five men, who figured prominently in the Buddha's life, are said to be Brahmins that his father, King Suddhodana, chose for him from the Sakya clan. | Butsuden no naka de mo jūyō na ichi o shimeru kono gonin wa, chichi no Suddōdana-ō ga Shaka-zoku no naka kara Baramon o erande tsukawashita to yū koto ni mo natte iru. (仏伝の中でも重要な位置を占めるこの五人は、父のスッドーダナ王がシャカ族の中からバラモンを選んでつかわしたということにもなっている。) | doing something to/for someone other than me/us |
| kureru (くれる・呉れる; 'give (to me/us)') | ‑te kureru / ‑de kureru (てくれる・でくれる) | | Will you lend me the book? (Note: Won't you give me the favor of lending me the book?) | Hon o kashite kurenai? (本を貸してくれない？) | doing something to/for me/us |
| kureru (くれる・呉れる; 'give (to me/us)') | ‑te kureru / ‑de kureru (てくれる・でくれる) | | You just embarrassed me, you know that? | Yoku mo haji o kakasete kureta na (よくも恥をかかせてくれたな) | doing something to/for me/us |
| kureru (くれる・呉れる; 'give (to me/us)') | ‑te kureru / ‑de kureru (てくれる・でくれる) | | Tell Melly that. | Meranī ni mo sō yūte kure. (メラニーにもそういうてくれ。) | doing something to/for me/us |
| kureru (くれる・呉れる; 'give (to me/us)') | ‑te kureru / ‑de kureru (てくれる・でくれる) | | "Kill me! Kill me! Kill me!" | "Koroshite kure! Koroshite kure! Koroshite kure!" (「殺してくれ！ 殺してくれ！ 殺してくれ！」) | doing something to/for me/us |
| okureru (おくれる・御呉れる; 'give (to me/us)') | ‑te okureru / ‑de okureru (ておくれる・でおくれる) | ‑tokureru / ‑dokureru (とくれる・どくれる) | "[...] Oh! Geneviève, thee, thou art an angel of goodness, dost thou want this? Dost thou want to make one man so happy that he no more regrets his life and no more desires eternal bliss? If so, instead of pushing me away, smile at me, my Geneviève, rest thy hand on mine arm, lean on the man who yearns for thee, putting his yearning into all his body and soul. Geneviève, my love, my life, Geneviève, take not back thy vow!" | "[...] Ā! Junuviēvu, kimi koso zen'i no tenshi da, sō daro? Kimi wa otoko o kono ue naku shiawase ni shite kureru, da kara aite wa, mō jinsei ga iya ni natta, nado to nageku koto mo nai shi, mō eikyū no kōfuku nan te hoshigaranaku naru jā nai ka na? Da kara, boku o oshinokeru kawari ni, boku ni hohoende okure, boku no Junuviēvu, kimi no te o boku no ude ni atete okure, zenshin zenrei, nozomi o komete kimi o nozonde iru otoko ni yorikakatte okure. Junuviēvu, boku no koibito, boku no inochi, Junuviēvu, mō kimi no chikai nan ka kurikaesanai de okure!" (「[...] アア！ ジュヌヴィエーヴ、きみこそ善意の天使だ、そうだろ？ きみは男をこの上なくしあわせにしてくれる、だから相手は、もう人生が嫌になった、などと嘆くこともないし、もう永久の幸福なんて欲しがらなくなるじゃあないかな？ だから、ぼくを押しのける代りに、ぼくにほほ笑んでおくれ、ぼくのジュヌヴィエーヴ、きみの手をぼくの腕に当てておくれ、全身全霊、望みをこめてきみを望んでいる男に寄りかかっておくれ。ジュヌヴィエーヴ、ぼくの恋人、ぼくの命、ジュヌヴィエーヴ、もうきみの誓いなんか繰りかえさないでおくれ！」) | doing something to/for me/us |
| okureru (おくれる・御呉れる; 'give (to me/us)') | ‑te okureru / ‑de okureru (ておくれる・でおくれる) | ‑tokureru / ‑dokureru (とくれる・どくれる) | Patience, be near me still; and set me lower: I have not long to trouble thee.—Good Griffith, Cause the musicians play me that sad note I named my knell, whilst I sit meditating On that celestial harmony I go to. | Pēshensu yo, shijū soba ni ite okure.‥‥ Motto hikuku shitokure. Mō nagai koto sewa mo kakemai.‥‥ Gurifisu ya, gakujindomo ni iitsukete, watashi ga watashi no tomuraigane to na o tsuketa ano aware na fu o sōsasetokure. (ペーシェンスよ、始終傍にゐておくれ。‥‥もっと低くしとくれ。もう長いこと世話も掛けまい。‥‥グリフィスや、樂人どもにいひつけて、わたしがわたしの弔鐘と名を附けたあの哀れな譜を奏させとくれ。‥‥) | doing something to/for me/us |
| okureru (おくれる・御呉れる; 'give (to me/us)') | ‑te okureru / ‑de okureru (ておくれる・でおくれる) | ‑tokureru / ‑dokureru (とくれる・どくれる) | I pray you.—Come, sirrah. | Nē, kitokure yo. (ねえ、來とくれよ。) | doing something to/for me/us |
| okureru (おくれる・御呉れる; 'give (to me/us)') | ‑te okureru / ‑de okureru (ておくれる・でおくれる) | ‑tokureru / ‑dokureru (とくれる・どくれる) | If I do die before thee, prithee, shroud me In one of those same sheets. | Moshi watashi ga omae yori mo saki shindara, nē, dō zo sono shikifu de motte tsutsundokure ne. (若しわたしがお前よりも先き死んだら、ねえ、どうぞ其敷布で以て包んどくれね。) | doing something to/for me/us |
| okureru (おくれる・御呉れる; 'give (to me/us)') | ‑te okureru / ‑de okureru (ておくれる・でおくれる) | ‑tokureru / ‑dokureru (とくれる・どくれる) | Buy it, read it, y'all! Another tragedy in the royal family! Duke Flint's eldest son's body has been found‼ | Sā kattokure yondokure! Ōshitsu de mata higeki da! Furinto-kō no chakunan ga shitai de hakken sareta‼ (さぁ買っとくれ 読んどくれ！王室でまた悲劇だ！フリント公の嫡男が死体で発見された‼) | doing something to/for me/us |
| okureru (おくれる・御呉れる; 'give (to me/us)') | ‑te okureru / ‑de okureru (ておくれる・でおくれる) | ‑tokureru / ‑dokureru (とくれる・どくれる) | "I don't want to die in vain just like that. If you want to die, die on your own" | "Atashi wa sonna inujini wa, gomen da yoh. Shinitakerya, jibun hitori de shindokureh" (「あたしはそんな犬死には、ご免だよッ。死にたけりゃ、自分一人で死んどくれッ」) | doing something to/for me/us |
| kudasaru (くださる・下さる; 'give (to me/us)') | ‑te kudasaru / ‑de kudasaru (てくださる・でくださる) | | "Once you do...... you will kill me?" | "Sō sureba...... anata wa, watakushi o koroshite kudasaru no desu ka?" (「そうすれば......あなたは、わたくしを殺してくださるのですか？」) | doing something to/for me/us |
| kudasaru (くださる・下さる; 'give (to me/us)') | ‑te kudasaru / ‑de kudasaru (てくださる・でくださる) | | He took the trouble to come to the airport and see me. | Wazawaza kūkō made mukae ni kite kudasatta (わざわざ空港まで迎えに来てくださった) | doing something to/for me/us |
| kudasaru (くださる・下さる; 'give (to me/us)') | ‑te kudasaru / ‑de kudasaru (てくださる・でくださる) | | Anyway, please get her to leave my hospital room. (Note: She receives a favor (dete itte moratte) by you getting her to leave, and you give me a favor (dete itte moratte kudasai) by doing that.) | Tonikaku, byōshitsu kara dete itte moratte kudasai (とにかく、病室から出ていってもらってください) | doing something to/for me/us |
| ii / yoi (いい・よい・良い・善い; 'be good') | ‑te ii / ‑de ii / ‑te yoi / ‑de yoi (ていい・てよい・でいい・でよい) | | Can I borrow this? | Kore karite ii desu ka (これ借りていいですか) | it's okay to do something |
| ii / yoi (いい・よい・良い・善い; 'be good') | ‑te ii / ‑de ii / ‑te yoi / ‑de yoi (ていい・てよい・でいい・でよい) | | Can I see you tomorrow? | Ashita otaku e asobi ni itte mo ii desu ka (明日お宅へ遊びに行ってもいいですか) | it's okay to do something |
| yoroshii (よろしい・宜しい; 'be good') | ‑te yoroshii / ‑de yoroshii (てよろしい・でよろしい) | | Starting tomorrow, you won't need to come to work. | Ashita kara kaisha ni konakute yoroshii (あしたから会社に来なくてよろしい) | it's okay to do something |
| hoshii (ほしい・欲しい; 'be wanted') | ‑te hoshii / ‑de hoshii (てほしい・でほしい) | | I hope my mother has a long life. | Haha ni wa nagaiki shite hoshii (母には長生きして欲しい) | it's desirable to do something |
| hoshii (ほしい・欲しい; 'be wanted') | ‑te hoshii / ‑de hoshii (てほしい・でほしい) | | Tell her to write it to his girls. | Wirukusu-ke no musumetachi ni mo, sō kaite okuru yō ni yūte hoshii. (ウィルクス家の娘たちにも、そう書いて送るようにいうてほしい。) | it's desirable to do something |

== Infinitive vs Gerund ==
The infinitive and the gerund have overlap in usage, although using the infinitive instead of the gerund is more common writing, cliches and stiff speech.

Infintives can be nested in clauses ending in gerunds:

- Migite ni hana o mochi, hidarite ni oke o sage, koshi ni hōki o sashite, aruite iku (右手に花を持ち、左手に桶を下げ、腰に箒を差して、歩いていく; transl. He walks away with flowers in his right hand, bucket hanging from his left, and broom stuck in his belt; all the infinitives are grouped together under one "manner" gerund)

Sometimes a gerund can precede clauses ending in infinitives:

- Bōen no shiya ga arukute, hyōteki ga yoku mie, jūshin ga karuku, shika mo handō ga sukunai (望遠の視野が明るくて、標的がよく見え、銃身が軽く、しかも反動が少ない; transl. The field of the telescopic gunsight is bright so that the target is easy to see, the gun barrel is light, and in addition there is little recoil; a "consequential" gerund turns up in the otherwise infinitive-only sentence)

According to Kuno (1973:195–199), the gerund "cannot be used when two simultaneous actions or states are involved":

- Jon wa yoku {asobi / ~~asonde~~}, yoku benkyō suru. (ジョンはよく{遊び・~~遊んで~~}、よく勉強する。; 'John plays a lot and studies a lot.')

If John plays and studies at the same time, only the infinitive asobi is appropriate. The gerundive asonde could be too only in the temporal sequence meaning, as if John plays first, then studies later. Likewise:

- Jon wa Mearī o {nikumi / ~~nikunde~~}, Jēn o aishite iru. (ジョンはメアリーを{憎み・~~憎んで~~}、ジェーンを愛している。; 'John hates Mary and loves Jane.')
- Jon wa jibun o {nikumi / ~~nikunde~~}, hito o nikunda. (ジョンは自分を{憎み・~~憎んで~~}、他人を憎んだ。; 'John hated himself and hated others.')

Another constraint on only the gerund, not the infinitive, is that "the two actions involved must be either both self-controllable or both non-self-controllable":

- Jon wa asa {okite / ~~me o samashite~~}, kao o aratta. (ジョンは朝{起きて・~~目を覚まして~~}、顔を洗った; 'John {got up / ~~woke up~~} in the morning and washed his face.')

Since "washing his face" is in John's control, only the intentional "getting up" is appropriate here, while the incidental "waking up", which is out of his control, is incompatible. Likewise:

- Jon wa hikōjō ni itte, nimotsu no kensa o uketa. (ジョンは飛行場に行って、荷物の検査を受けた。; 'John went to the airport and underwent luggage inspection.'; "going to the airport" is in John's control, so "undergoing luggage inspection" should be too in that John intentionally underwent it)
- Jon wa hikōjō ni tsuite, nimotsu no kensa o uketa. (ジョンは飛行場に着いて、荷物の検査を受けた。; 'John arrived at the airport and underwent luggage inspection.'; "arriving at the airport" is out of John's control, so "undergoing luggage inspection" should be too in that John passively underwent it)
- Jon wa hikōjō {ni itte / ~~ni tsuite~~}, ie ni denwa o shita. (ジョンは飛行場{に行って・~~に着いて~~}、家に電話をした。; 'John {went to / ~~arrived at~~} the airport and called home.'; both "calling home" and "going to the airport" are in John's control, but "arriving at the airport" is not)
- Jon wa Mearī ni {atte / ~~gūzen deatte~~}, sono hanashi o shita. (ジョンはメアリーに{会って・~~偶然出会って~~}、その話をした。; 'John {saw / ~~chanced on~~} Mary and talked about it.'; both "talking about it" and "seeing Mary" are in John's control, but "chancing on Mary" is not)

The infinitive is applicable in the above cases where the gerund is not:

- Jon wa asa me o samashi, kao o aratta. (ジョンは朝目を覚まし、顔を洗った; 'John woke up in the morning and washed his face.')
- Jon wa hikōjō ni tsuki, ie ni denwa o shita. (ジョンは飛行場に着き、家に電話をした。; 'John arrived at the airport and called home.')
- Jon wa Mearī ni gūzen deai, sono hanashi o shita. (ジョンはメアリーに偶然出会い、その話をした。; 'John chanced on Mary and talked about it.')

In the "manner" (Note: Per Martin (2004)'s terminology. Kuno (1973:198–199) calls this an "attendant circumstance".) meaning ("while doing something"), either the infinitive or the gerund can be used:

- Jon wa {iwazu / iwanai de}, gohan o tabeta. (ジョンは一言も{言わず・言わないで}、ご飯を食べた。; 'John ate without saying a word.')

Either the infinitive tobi (飛び; lit. 'flying') or the gerundive tonde (飛んで) can be used for a zeroed place in a number. For example the number 2005 ("two thousand and five"), with two zeroed places, can be said as nisen tobi tobi/tonde tonde go.

== Perfective ==
The perfect(ive) (完了形, kanryōkei), past (過去形, kakokei) or ‑ta form generally conveys a past time. However, for certain verbs, especially in the attributive (before a noun), it may not have anything to do with a past time; or in certain uses, it is more about the perfect aspect, or some sort of completion, past or not.

Perfective form example sentences
| English | Japanese | Function |
|---|---|---|
| 'You are her murderer,' Sir Hugh said, an evil smile on his mouth. 'For I intend to see you dead, and she had to be silenced. She had served her purpose. Besides, she fell on my sword—which, as you know, was meant for you.' | "Onna o koroshita no wa, omae da yo. Da kara ore wa, omae o korosu. Tsumari seitō bōei" Hyū-kyō wa jaaku na emi o kuchimoto ni ukabete itta. "Kono onna no yakume wa owatta. Ikashite oku to mendō na koto ni naru ka mo shiren. Mokugekisha no kuchi wa fūjiru no ga futsū darō?" (「女を殺したのは、おまえだよ。だからおれは、おまえを殺す。つまり正当防衛さ」ヒュー卿は邪悪な笑みを口もとに浮かべて言った。「この女の役目は終わった。生かしておくと面倒なことになるかもしれん。目撃者の口は封じるのが普通だろう？」) | past time or past perfect |
| I went on deeper and deeper into the forest, and it occurred to me to seek help from the good hermit [...] Perhaps, his comforting words would ease a bit the pain that was beyond what I could take. | Watashi wa, mori no okufukaku e dondon haitte yukimashita. Sō shite iru uchi ni, ano zenryō na yosutebito ni tasuke o motomeyō to omoitachimashita. [...] Tabun, kare no nagusame no kotoba wa, watashi no uketa mi ni amaru kutsū o, ikubaku ka wa yawaragete kureru deshō. (私は、森の奥深くへどんどん入ってゆきました。そうしているうちに、あの善良な世捨て人に助けを求めようと思い立ちました。[...]多分、彼の慰めの言葉は、私の受けた身に余る苦痛を、幾ばくかは和らげてくれるでしょう。) | past time or past perfect |
| Dragon Shiryū is dead. (Note: In this case, "has just died" a moment ago, rather than "died" a long time ago.) | Doragon Shiryū wa shinda‼ (ドラゴン紫龍は死んだ‼) | past time or past perfect |
| Japan has become affluent. | Nihon wa yutaka ni natta. (日本は豊かになった。) | past time or past perfect |
| Nikolai Chikildeyev, a waiter at the Moscow restaurant Slavic Bazaar, fell ill. [...] He had no choice but to leave his job. [...] He thought that [...] not to mention that entering one's own home is in itself healing. | Mosukofu no resutoran Surabu-tei no kyūjinin Nikorai Chūjirō ga byōki ni natta. [...] Kō shite yamu o ezu hima o toraneba narananda. [...] sore ni wagaya ni haireba sore dake de mo kusuri ni naru to omōta. (莫斯古の料理店スラブ亭の給仕人二兒來忠次郞が病氣に成た。[...]かうして止むを得ず暇を取らねばならなんだ。[...]それに我家に入れば其れだけでも藥に成ると想ふたのだ。) | past time or past perfect |
| If I fail, I have to bear the responsibility. (Note: As for the future day on which I have failed.) | Shippai shita hi ni wa sekinin o toranakereba naranai (失敗した日には責任を取らなければならない) | non-past perfect |
| Beer drunk after a loss seems to have even more of a hoppy taste than usual. (Note: "After losing" or "after having lost". ‑Ta ato (た後; 'after') works, but *‑ta mae (た前; 'before') does not.) | Maketa ato no bīru no aji wa, masumasu horonigaku kanjirareru (負けた後のビールの味は、ますますほろ苦く感じられる) | non-past perfect |
| Giant walls of snow are formed after the snowplows have passed through. | Josetsusha ga tōtta ato ni wa kyodai na yukikabe ga dekite iku (除雪車が通った後には巨大な雪壁ができていく) | non-past perfect |
| It weighs on my mind even after I separate from someone I've liked. | Ichido suki ni natta hito no koto wa wakareta ato mo ki ni naru. (一度好きになった人のことは別れた後も気になる) | non-past perfect |
| Come to think of it, Mr and Mrs F are a married couple with different surnames, right? (Note: I've just realized you have different surnames.) | Sō ieba Efu-san wa bessei fūfu datta ne. (そういえばFさんは別姓夫婦だったね。) | non-past state recently recognized by the speaker |
| This is the one! (Note: I've just noticed this is the one.) | Kore deshita ka (これでしたか) | non-past state recently recognized by the speaker |
| Eh? Bullying exists in Britain too? It was silly of me to vaguely think that it's unique to Japan. (Note: I've just realized bully exists in Britain too.) | Eh, Igirisu ni mo ijime wa atta no ka, Nihon dake no mono ka na to bakuzen to kangaete ita no wa amakatta. (えっ、イギリスにもいじめはあったのか、日本だけのものかなと漠然と考えていたのは甘かった。) | non-past state recently recognized by the speaker |
| Yes, yes, I have an appointment next Sunday. (Note: I've just remembered there's an appointment next Sunday.) | Sō sō, tsugi no nichiyō wa yakusoku ga arimashita (そうそう、次の日曜は約束がありました) | non-past state recently recognized by the speaker |
| secure life (Note: Predicatively, seikatsu ga antei shite iru ("life is secured").) | antei shita seikatsu (安定した生活) | attributively, "having done something with a persistent result", instead of the gerundive ‑te iru; ‑te iru may still be possible attributively |
| excellent artist (Note: Predicatively, gaka ga sugurete iru ("the artist excels").) | sugureta gaka (優れた画家) | attributively, "having done something with a persistent result", instead of the gerundive ‑te iru; ‑te iru may still be possible attributively |
| Stiffness that is confined to either the left or right side requires care. (Note: Predicatively, kori ga katayotte iru ("stiffness is confined to one side").) | Sayū dochira ka ni katayotta kori wa yōchūi da. (左右どちらかに偏った凝りは要注意だ。) | attributively, "having done something with a persistent result", instead of the gerundive ‑te iru; ‑te iru may still be possible attributively |
| You have your hanko with you, I presume. | Hanko o omochi deshita ne (判子をお持ちでしたね) | politeness |
| If I'd hurried I would have been in time, but I gave up along the way. | Isogeba ma ni atta (darō) ga, tochū de dannen shita (急げば間に合った(だろう)が、途中で断念した) | past counterfactual tentativity; also see Japanese conjugation § Conditional |

=== Perfective: Conjugation table ===
The perfective form is created by using the onbinkei base, followed by the ta/da (た・だ) suffix, which was historically a combination of te (as in the gerunds below) and the verb aru ("exist"). Note that ‑te aru now has different uses from ‑ta, and there can even be ‑te atta (← ‑te + ari + ‑ta) as well. ‑Ta, ‑tara(ba), ‑tari, ‑tarō trigger the same sound changes as ‑te as shown above.

Note that despite their common origin, ‑ta and ‑te aru are split differently by particles. Here, the particle wa is illustratively used:

- kaita (書いた; transl. I wrote) → kaki wa shita (書きはした; transl. I DID write)
- kaite aru (書いてある; transl. it's been written) → kaite wa aru (書いてはある; transl. it HAS been written)

The past form of the eastern negative auxiliary ‑nai, which is grammatically adjectival, is ‑nakatta (← ‑naku + atta). The western ‑n, on the other hand, has multiple variants: ‑nanda, ‑zatta (← ‑zu + atta), ‑henkatta, ‑n jatta, ‑n datta (Note: From the minutes of a town meeting in Kyushu. Itta iwan datta (言った言わんだった; lit. 'said or didn't say') is equivalent to itta iwanakatta (言った言わなかった).), ‑n yatta (all three from ‑n + de atta), etc. ‑Nkatta is found in both the east and the west.

While ‑n is largely western, it is still used in the polite negative ‑masen in eastern dialects as well, and it also has multiple variants for past negative forms with:

- Politeness marked by ‑mase‑, and past negativity by plain auxiliaries: ‑masenanda, ‑masenkatta, ‑mahenkatta
- Politeness marked by ‑mase‑, negativity by ‑n, and pastness by variants of the copula de atta: ‑masen jatta/datta/yatta, ‑mahen jatta/datta/yatta
- Politeness marked by both ‑mase‑ and deshi‑, negativity by ‑n, and pastness by ‑ta: ‑masen deshita, ‑mahen deshita

Alternatively, politeness can be marked only with desu instead of ‑mase‑, with:

- Past negativity marked by plain auxiliaries, and politeness by desu: ‑nakatta desu, ‑nkatta desu, ‑henkatta desu
- Negativity marked by ‑n, pastness by variants of the copula de atta, politeness by desu: ‑n jatta/datta/yatta desu
- Negativity marked by ‑n, and past politeness by the copula deshita: ‑n deshita, ‑hen deshita

Of the above, only ‑masen deshita and ‑nakatta desu are accepted in Tokyo Japanese.

The now western-only ‑nanda was used in the older Edo Japanese (the precursor of the modern Tokyo Japanese), as in torananda (取らなんだ; 'did not take', equivalent to toranakatta), mairimasenanda (参りませなんだ; 'did not visit', equivalent to mairimasen deshita), shiremashinanda (知れましなんだ; 'could not know; did not become known', equivalent to shiremasen deshita), de arimasenanda (でありませなんだ; 'were not', equivalent to de arimasen deshita), etc. In Tokyo Japanese, ‑nanda was displaced by ‑nakatta, while ‑masenanda was displaced by ‑masenkatta, ‑masen datta, and ultimately ‑masen deshita. ‑Nanda and ‑masenanda can still be used in literature to convey dialectal or faux-archaic speech, even if that speech is anachronistic or made by non-Japanese characters.

| Dictionary form | Pattern | | | Perfective form |
Godan and pseudo-yodan verbs
| 結う (yuu/yū, fasten) | 結う | 結っ 結う | た | 結った (yutta, fastened) 結うた (yūta) |
| 言(い)う (yū, say) | ゆう | いっ ゆっ ゆう | た | 言った (itta/yutta, said) 言うた (yūta) |
| 会う (au/ō, meet) | あう おう | あっ おう | た | 会った (atta, met) 会うた (ōta) |
| 祝う (iwau/iō, celebrate) | いわう いおう | いわっ いおう | た | 祝った (iwatta, celebrated) 祝うた (iōta) |
| 紛う (magau/magō, mistake) | まがう まごう | まがっ まごう | た | 紛った (magatta, mistook) 紛うた (magōta) |
| 給う (tamau/tamō, bestow) | たまう たもう | たもう たまっ | た | 給うた (tamōta, bestowed) 給った (tamatta) |
| 宣う (notamau/notamō, say) | のたまう のたもう | のたもう のたまっ | た | 宣うた (notamōta, said) 宣った (notamatta) |
| 負う (ou/ō, carry) | 負う | 負っ 負う | た | 負った (otta, carried) 負うた (ōta) (Note: Occurs in the proverbs 負うた子に教えられて浅瀬を渡る (ōta ko ni oshierarete asase o wataru; lit. 'one crosses the shallows by learning from the child's one's carrying on the back', transl. the elder can learn from the younger) and 負うた子より抱いた子 (ōta ko yori daita ko; lit. 'the child carried in the arms over the child carried on the back', transl. one prioritizes one's innermost circle).) |
| 覆う (ōu/oō, cover) | 覆う | 覆っ 覆う | た | 覆った (ōtta, covered) 覆うた (oōta) |
| 問う (tou/tō, inquire) | 問う | 問う 問っ | た | 問うた (tōta, inquired) 問った (totta) |
| 訪う (tou/tō, visit) | 訪う | 訪う 訪っ | た | 訪うた (tōta, visited) 訪った (totta) |
| 請う (kou/kō, solicit) | 請う | 請う 請っ | た | 請うた (kōta, solicited) 請った (kotta) |
| 恋う (kou/kō, long for) | 恋う | 恋う 恋っ | た | 恋うた (kōta, longed for) 恋った (kotta) |
| 厭う (itou/itō, grudge) | 厭う | 厭う 厭っ | た | 厭うた (itōta, grudged) 厭った (itotta) |
| 勝つ (katsu, win) | 勝つ | 勝っ | た | 勝った (katta, won) |
| 狩る (karu, hunt) | 狩る | 狩っ | た | 狩った (katta, hunted) |
| 貸す (kasu, lend) | 貸す | 貸し | た | 貸した (kashita, lent) |
| 書く (kaku, write) | 書く | 書い | た | 書いた (kaita, wrote) |
| 嗅ぐ (kagu, smell) | 嗅ぐ | 嗅い | だ | 嗅いだ (kaida, smelled) |
| 呼ぶ (yobu, call) | 呼ぶ | 呼ん | だ | 呼んだ (yonda, called) |
| 読む (yomu, read) | 読む | 読ん | だ | 読んだ (yonda, read) |
| 死ぬ (shinu, die) | 死ぬ | 死ん | だ | 死んだ (shinda, died) |
Irregular godan verbs
| 行く (iku/yuku, go) | いく ゆく | いっ ゆっ い ゆい いい | た | 行った (itta/yutta, went) 行た (ita) 行いた (yuita/iita) |
Ichidan verbs
| 見る (miru, look) | 見~~る~~ | 見 | た | 見た (mita, looked) |
| 出る (deru, exit) | 出~~る~~ | 出 | た | 出た (deta, exited) |
Irregular verbs
| する (suru, do) | す~~る~~ | し | た | した (shita, did) |
| 来る (kuru, come) | く~~る~~ | き | た | 来た (kita, came) |
Verbal auxiliaries
| 〜ます(る) (‑masu(ru)) | ます~~(る)~~ | まし | た | 〜ました (‑mashita) |
| です (desu, be) | です | でし | た | でした (deshita, were) |
| である (de aru, be) だ (da) じゃ (ja) や (ya) | である だ じゃ や | であっ だっ じゃっ やっ | た | であった (de atta, were) だった (datta) じゃった (jatta) やった (yatta) |
Adjective and adjectival auxiliaries
| 無い (nai, be nonexistent) 無かる (nakaru) | 無かる | 無かっ | た | 無かった (nakatta, were nonexistent) |
| 良い (ii/yoi, be good) 良かる (yokaru) | 良かる | 良かっ | た | 良かった (yokatta, were good) |
Special auxiliaries
| 〜ん (‑n) 〜ぬ (‑nu) | ん ぬ | なん | だ | 〜なんだ (‑nanda) |
| 〜ません (‑masen) 〜ませぬ (‑masenu) | ません ませぬ | ません ませぬ | でした | 〜ませんでした (‑masen deshita) 〜ませぬでした (‑masenu deshita) |
| 〜ません (‑masen) 〜ませぬ (‑masenu) | ません ませぬ | ませなん | だ | 〜ませなんだ (‑masenanda) |

=== Perfective: Grammatical compatibility ===
Morphologically, ‑ta equals ‑te aru, which means it also has some derived forms that aru has:

- Irrealis: ‑tara (← ‑te ara)
  - Conditional: ‑tara(ba) (← ‑te araba)
  - Tentative: ‑tarō (← ‑te arō)
- Classical conclusive and infinitive: ‑tari (← ‑te ari)
  - Representative/alternative: ‑tari. This form, which tends to occur in an iterative sequence, the last instance of which is typically followed by the verb suru ("do"), refers to typical or intermittent happenings or conditions, which involve one or more parties doing a sample set of one or more things, each party doing either one or several of those things, something to the effect of "A does such and such, B does such and such, and so on and so forth." The last ‑tari, as in ‑tari suru, is tending to be replaced by a conclusive altogether.

Representative example sentences
| English | Japanese |
|---|---|
| Meanwhile, Bunroku got sick and his wife died, you see. | Sono uchi ni, Bunroku ga byōki ni nattari, Bunroku no saikun ga shindari shimashite ne (そのうちに、文六が病気になったり、文六の細君が死んだりしましてね) |
| The present-day world is one where they cry peace peace with their mouths while a student brandishing a samurai sword hijacks an airplane and a mother chokes her baby to death! | Gendai wa heiwa heiwa to kuchi de wa tonaenagara, Nihontō o furikazashita gakusei ga hikōki o nottottari, hahaoya kantan ni akanbō o hinerikoroshitari suru yo no naka desu (現代は平和平和と口では唱えながら、日本刀を振りかざした学生が飛行機を乗っ取ったり、母親が簡単に赤ん坊をひねり殺したりするよのなかです) |
| Parents sometimes kill children, children sometimes kill parents. (Note: Alternatively, Oya ga ko o koroshitari, kodomo ga oya o koroshitari suru (親が子を殺したり、子供が親を殺したりする).) | Oya ga ko o koroshitari, kodomo ga oya o korosu (親が子を殺したり、子供が親を殺す) |
| He dozed over his books, slept in more than usual, felt listless when preparing lessons, seemed sick and tired of study. | Shomotsu no ue ni madorondari, itsu mo yori asane o shitari, gakka no shitashirabe mo taikutsu sō de attari, benkyō ga akiaki shita yō ni miemashita. (書物の上にまどろんだり、いつもより朝寢をしたり、學課の下調べも退屈さうであつたり、勉强があき〱したやうに見えました。) |
| It's sometimes written this way. | Sore o kaitari suru (それを書いたりする) |
| When it's a pair with at least one woman, after they've passed by me, they sometimes exchange looks. | Onnazure da to, tōrisugite kara, kao miawasetari suru no (女連れだと、通り過ぎてから、顔見合わせたりするの) |
| But he never forced this style on people. | Shika shi kono ryūgi o hitobito ni kyōsei shitari wa shinakatta (しかしこの流儀を人々に強制したりはしなかった) |
| The elder sister would call her younger sister otōto, never imōto. (Note: In ancient Japan, imōto meant "sister" to a brother, rather than "younger sister" in general; and otōto meant "younger sibling of the same gender", either "sister" to an older sister, or "brother" to an older brother, rather than "younger brother" in general. "Brother" to a sister was seuto or shōto.) | Ane mo imōto o otōto to itte, imōto ittari wa shinai (姉も妹を弟と言って、妹と言ったりはしない) |
| I don't know why he ever brought a camera in. | Dō shite kamera o mochikondari shita no ka wakaranai (どうしてカメラを持ち込んだりしたのか分からない) |

== See also ==
- Japanese conjugation
- Japanese godan and ichidan verbs
- Honorific speech in Japanese
- Japanese adjectives
- Japanese particles
- Japanese grammar

== Bibliography ==
- Akimoto, Morihide (1 March 2001). Yamaguchi, Akiho; Akimoto, Morihide (eds.). 日本語文法大辞典 (in Japanese). Chiyoda, Tokyo: Meiji Shoin. pp. 709–710, 712–714, 742–743, 822–823, 871. ISBN 4-625-40300-6.
- Banno, Eri; Ikeda, Yōko; Ohno, Yutaka; Shinagawa, Chikako; Tokashiki, Kyōko (5 March 2020a) [20 May 1999]. GENKI: An Integrated Course in Elementary Japanese Ⅰ (3rd ed.). Chiyoda, Tokyo: The Japan Times Publishing. ISBN 978-4-7890-1730-5.
- Banno, Eri; Ikeda, Yōko; Ohno, Yutaka; Shinagawa, Chikako; Tokashiki, Kyōko (5 October 2020b) [20 October 1999]. GENKI: An Integrated Course in Elementary Japanese Ⅱ (3rd ed.). Chiyoda, Tokyo: The Japan Times Publishing. ISBN 978-4-7890-1732-9.
- Frellesvig, Bjarke (2010). A History of the Japanese Language. New York: Cambridge University Press. ISBN 978-0-521-65320-6.
- Fujii, Toshihiro (1 March 2001). Yamaguchi, Akiho; Akimoto, Morihide (eds.). 日本語文法大辞典 (in Japanese). Chiyoda, Tokyo: Meiji Shoin. pp. 38–39, 58–59, 100–101. ISBN 4-625-40300-6.
- Henderson, Harold Gould (1948) [1943]. Handbook of Japanese Grammar (revised ed.). Cambridge, Massachusetts: The Riverside Press.
- Iori, Isao; Takanashi, Shino; Nakanishi, Kumiko; Yamada, Toshihiro (15 November 2018). Matsuoka, Hiroshi (ed.). 初(しょ)級(きゅう)を教(おし)える人(ひと)のための日(に)本(ほん)文(ぶん)法(ぽう)ハンドブック (in Japanese). Chiyoda, Tokyo: 3A Corporation.
- Itoi, Michihiro (1 March 2001). Yamaguchi, Akiho; Akimoto, Morihide (eds.). 日本語文法大辞典 (in Japanese). Chiyoda, Tokyo: Meiji Shoin. pp. 614–617, 821–822. ISBN 4-625-40300-6.
- Kaiser, Stefan; Ichikawa, Yasuko; Kobayashi, Noriko; Yamamoto, Hilofumi (2013) [2001]. Japanese: A Comprehensive Grammar. Routledge Comprehensive Grammars (2nd ed.). Milton Park, Abingdon, Oxfordshire, Oxford; New York: Routledge. ISBN 978-0-203-08519-6.
- Kimura, Masanori (1 March 2001). しる （知る）. In Yamaguchi, Akiho; Akimoto, Morihide (eds.). 日本語文法大辞典 (in Japanese). Chiyoda, Tokyo: Meiji Shoin. pp. 353–354. ISBN 4-625-40300-6.
- Komatsu, Kōzō (1 March 2001). Yamaguchi, Akiho; Akimoto, Morihide (eds.). 日本語文法大辞典 (in Japanese). Chiyoda, Tokyo: Meiji Shoin. pp. 67–68, 161–162. ISBN 4-625-40300-6.
- Kubota, Atsushi (1 March 2001). Yamaguchi, Akiho; Akimoto, Morihide (eds.). 日本語文法大辞典 (in Japanese). Chiyoda, Tokyo: Meiji Shoin. pp. 32–33, 747. ISBN 4-625-40300-6.
- Koyanagi, Tomokazu (March 2014). 中央語における動詞活用の歴史 (PDF). 全国方言文法辞典資料集 (in Japanese). 2. 方言文法研究会: 20–29. NCID: BB1529267X. Archived (PDF) from the original on 20 October 2018.
- Kuno, Susumu (1973). The Structure of the Japanese Language. Cambridge, Massachusetts; London, England: MIT Press. ISBN 0-262-11049-0.
- Kuno, Susumu (1 April 1983). 新日本文法研究 (in Japanese). Chiyoda, Tokyo: Taishukan Publishing.
- Lammers, Wayne P. (2005). Japanese the Manga Way: An Illustrated Guide to Grammar and Structure (in English and Japanese). Berkeley, California: Stone Bridge Press. ISBN 978-1-880656-90-7.
- Makino, Seiichi; Tsutsui, Michio (20 May 2018) [20 March 1986]. A Dictionary of Basic Japanese Grammar 日本語基本文法辞典 (77th ed.). Minato, Tokyo: The Japan Times. ISBN 978-4-7890-0454-1.
- Martin, Samuel Elmo (2004) [1975]. A Reference Grammar of Japanese (revised ed.). Honolulu: University of Hawai'i Press. ISBN 0-8248-2818-6.
- Matsuoka McClain, Yoko (1986) [1981]. Handbook of Modern Japanese Grammar: including Lists of Words and Expressions with English Equivalents for Reading Aid 口語日本文法便覧（日本語特殊表現とその英語相当訳及び例題付）. Chiyoda, Tokyo: The Hokuseido Press. ISBN 4-590-00570-0.
- Ministry of Education, Science, Sports and Culture (15 September 1935a). 口語法別記 (in Japanese) (3rd ed.). Kyōbashi, Tokyo: Dainippon Tosho.
- Miura, Akira (2011). Essential Japanese Vocabulary: Learn to Avoid Common (and Embarrassing!) Mistakes. Tuttle Publishing. ISBN 978-4-8053-1127-1.
- Miyake, Toshihiro (1 April 2016). 可能動詞の成立. 日本語の研究 (in Japanese). 12 (2): 1–17. doi:10.20666/nihongonokenkyu.12.2_1. Archived from the original on 20 November 2017.
- Nakamura, Masayuki (31 March 2009). 日本語動詞の音便について (PDF). Kotonoha (in Japanese) (76). Japan: 古代文字資料館: 1–3. Archived (PDF) from the original on 19 August 2019.
- Nakano, Kotoyo (September 2008). "Japanese potential verb" 日本語の可能動詞 (PDF). 下関市立大学論集 (in Japanese). 52 (1–2). 下関市立大学学会: 103–114. ISSN 0387-5296. OCLC 183202722. SC20052000109. Archived (PDF) from the original on 26 January 2021.
- Shibuya, Katsumi (March 2002). Ōnishi, Takuichirō (ed.). 方言文法調査ガイドブック (PDF) (in Japanese). Kita, Tokyo: National Institute for Japanese Language and Linguistics.
- Poser, William John (23 November 1984). The Phonetics and Phonology of Tone and Intonation in Japanese (PDF) (doctoral thesis). Massachusetts Institute of Technology.
- Rubin, Jay (January 2004) [January 2002]. Making Sense of Japanese: What the Textbooks Don’t Tell You 日(に)本(ほん)語(ご)の秘(ひ)訣(けつ) (3rd ed.). Kodansha International. ISBN 4-7700-2802-4.
- Sakaki, Mika (17 January 2019). 動詞の音便の方言学的研究―サ行イ音便を中心として― (doctoral thesis) (in Japanese). Tohoku University. Archived from the original on 28 June 2021.
- Shirane, Haruo (2005). Classical Japanese: A Grammar. New York: Columbia University Press. ISBN 978-0-231-13524-5.
- Suzuki, Hideo (1 March 2001). Yamaguchi, Akiho; Akimoto, Morihide (eds.). 日本語文法大辞典 (in Japanese). Chiyoda, Tokyo: Meiji Shoin. pp. 336, 359–360, 598–599, 745–747, 843–844. ISBN 4-625-40300-6.
- Yada, Tsutomu (1 March 2001). Yamaguchi, Akiho; Akimoto, Morihide (eds.). 日本語文法大辞典 (in Japanese). Chiyoda, Tokyo: Meiji Shoin. pp. 209–210, 216. ISBN 4-625-40300-6.
- Yamaguchi, Akiho (1 March 2001). Yamaguchi, Akiho; Akimoto, Morihide (eds.). 日本語文法大辞典 (in Japanese). Chiyoda, Tokyo: Meiji Shoin. pp. 63–64, 162–163, 424–425, 502, 508–509, 728, 777, 822, 853. ISBN 4-625-40300-6.
- Yamauchi, Keisuke (1 March 2001). なさる（為さる）. In Yamaguchi, Akiho; Akimoto, Morihide (eds.). 日本語文法大辞典 (in Japanese). Chiyoda, Tokyo: Meiji Shoin. pp. 557–558. ISBN 4-625-40300-6.
