= Japanese conjugation =

Overview of how Japanese verbs conjugate

Japanese conjugation, like the conjugation of verbs of many other languages, allows verbs to be morphologically modified to change their meaning or grammatical function. In Japanese, the beginning of a word (the stem) is preserved during conjugation, while the ending of the word is altered in some way to change the meaning (this is the inflectional suffix). Japanese verb conjugations are independent of person, number and gender (they do not depend on whether the subject is I, you, he, she, we, etc.); the conjugated forms can express meanings such as negation, present and past tense, volition, passive voice, causation, imperative and conditional mood, and ability. There are also special forms for conjunction with other verbs, and for combination with particles for additional meanings.

Japanese verbs have agglutinating properties: some of the conjugated forms are themselves conjugable verbs (or i-adjectives), which can result in several suffixes being strung together in a single verb form to express a combination of meanings.

A revision sheet visually summarizing the conjugations and uses described below

== Verb groups ==
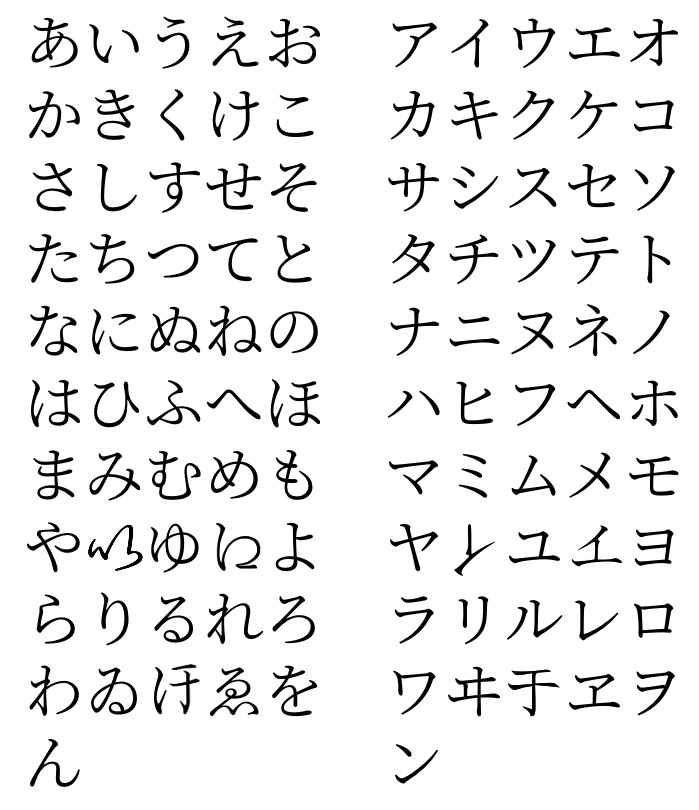
Gojuon Table

For Japanese verbs, the verb stem remains invariant among all conjugations. However, conjugation patterns vary according to a verb's category. For example, 知る (shiru) and 着る (kiru) belong to different verb categories (godan and ichidan, respectively) and therefore follow different conjugation patterns. As such, knowing a verb's category is essential for conjugating Japanese verbs.

Japanese verbs can be allocated into three categories:

1. Godan verbs (五段動詞, godan-dōshi; literally: "five‑row verbs"), also known as "pentagrade verbs"
2. Ichidan verbs (一段動詞, ichidan-dōshi; literally: "one‑row verbs"), also known as "monograde verbs"
3. Irregular verbs, most notably: する (suru, to do) and 来る (kuru, to come)

Verbs are conjugated from their "dictionary form", where the final kana is either removed or changed in some way. From a technical standpoint, verbs usually require a specific conjugational stem (see § Verb bases, below) for any given inflection or suffix. With godan verbs, the conjugational stem can span all five columns of the gojūon kana table (hence, the classification as a pentagrade verb). Ichidan verbs are simpler to conjugate: the final kana, which is always る (ru), is simply removed or replaced with the appropriate inflectional suffix. This means ichidan verb stems, in themselves, are valid conjugational stems which always end with the same kana (hence, the classification as a monograde verb).

This distinction can be observed by comparing conjugations of the two verb types, within the context of the gojūon table.

Godan form	Gojūon table 'ma' row	Godan verb 読む (to read)	Ichidan form	Ichidan verb 見る (to see)	Ichidan verb 止める (to stop)
Negative	ま (ma)	読まない yomanai	Negative	みない^{*} minai	止めない tomenai
Polite	み (mi)	読みます yomimasu	Polite	みます^{*} mimasu	止めます tomemasu
Dictionary (no conjugation)	む (mu)	読む yomu	Dictionary	みる^{*} miru	止める tomeru
Potential	め (me)	読める yomeru	Potential	みられる^{*} mirareru	止められる tomerareru
Hortative	も (mo)	読もう yomō	Hortative	みよう^{*} miyō	止めよう tomeyō

^{*} These forms are given here in hiragana for illustrative purposes; they would normally be written with kanji as 見ない, 見ます etc.

As can be seen above, the godan verb yomu (読む, to read) has a static verb stem, yo- (読〜), and a dynamic conjugational stem which changes depending on the purpose: yoma‑ (読ま〜; row 1), yomi‑ (読み〜; row 2), yomu (読む; row 3), yome‑ (読め〜; row 4) and yomo‑ (読も〜; row 5). Unlike godan verb stems, ichidan verb stems are also functional conjugational stems, with the final kana of the stem remaining static in all conjugations.

== Verb bases ==
Conjugable words (verbs, i‑adjectives, and na‑adjectives) are traditionally considered to have six possible conjugational stems or bases (活用形, katsuyōkei; literally "conjugation forms"). However, as a result of the language evolving, historical sound shifts, and the post‑WWII spelling reforms, three additional sub‑bases have emerged for verbs (seen in the table below as the Potential, Tentative, and Euphonic bases). Meanwhile, verbs no longer differentiate between the conclusive form (終止形, shūshikei; used to terminate a predicate) and the attributive form (連体形, rentaikei; used to modify a noun or noun phrase) bases (these bases are only distinguished for na‑adjectives in the modern language, see Japanese adjectives). Verb bases function as the necessary stem forms to which inflectional suffixes attach.

The "default" dictionary form, or lemma, of any conjugational morpheme, be it a verb, an adjective or an auxiliary, is its conclusive form, which is listed first in the table below. The verb group (godan, ichidan, or irregular) determines how to derive any given conjugation base for the verb. With godan verbs, the base is derived by shifting the final kana along the respective vowel row of the gojūon kana table. With ichidan verbs, the base is derived by removing or replacing the final ru (る) kana.

The table below illustrates the various verb bases across the verb groups, with the patterns starting from the dictionary form. The mizenkei base for verbs ending in ‑u (〜う) appears to be an exceptional case with the unexpected ‑wa (〜わ). This realization of ‑wa is a leftover from past sound changes, an artifact preserved from the archaic Japanese ‑fu from ‑pu verbs (which would have yielded, regularly, ‑wa from ‑fa from ‑pa). This is noted with historical kana orthography in dictionaries; for example, yū (言う) from ifu (言ふ) from ipu and iwanu (言わぬ) from ifanu (言はぬ) (from ipanu). In modern Japanese, original instances of mid‑word consonant [w] have since been dropped before all vowels except [a]. (For more on this shift in consonants, see Old Japanese § Consonants, Early Middle Japanese § Consonants, and Late Middle Japanese § /h/ and /p/).

Verb base formation table
Verb base	Aliases	Godan		Ichidan		Irregular				Usage
Verb base	Aliases	言う ('to say')	狩る ('to hunt')	見る ('to look')	出る ('to exit')	する ('to do')			来る ('to come')	Usage
Shūshikei (終止形)	conclusive, concluding form, final, predicative, dictionary form (辞書形, jishokei), indicative, imperfect, present, nonpast	言う (yū)	狩る (karu)	見る (miru)	出る (deru)	する (suru)			くる (kuru)	Imperfective form
Rentaikei (連体形)	attributive, adnominal, adjectival, substantival	言う (yū)	狩る (karu)	見る (miru)	出る (deru)	する (suru)			くる (kuru)	Imperfective form
Kateikei (仮定形)	provisional, conditional, hypothetical, izenkei (已然形), perfect, perfective, realis	Shift the 〜〇 kana to the え row								Conditional form
Kateikei (仮定形)	provisional, conditional, hypothetical, izenkei (已然形), perfect, perfective, realis	言え (ie)	狩れ (kare)	見れ (mire)	出れ (dere)	すれ (sure)			くれ (kure)	Conditional form
Meireikei (命令形)	imperative	Shift the 〜〇 kana to the え row		Replace る with ろ or よ						Imperative form
Meireikei (命令形)	imperative	言え (ie)	狩れ (kare)	見ろ (miro) 見よ (miyo)	出ろ (dero) 出よ (deyo)	しろ (shiro) せよ (seyo)			こい (koi)	Imperative form
Mizenkei (未然形)	imperfect, imperfective, irrealis, dubitative, future, a-stem, subjunctive, negative	Shift the 〜〇 kana to the あ row		Remove る						Negative form Passive form Causative form
Mizenkei (未然形)	imperfect, imperfective, irrealis, dubitative, future, a-stem, subjunctive, negative	言わ iwa/yuwa	狩ら (kara)	見 (mi)	出 (de)	さ (sa)	し (shi)	せ (se)	こ (ko)	Negative form Passive form Causative form
Ishikei (意志形)	(co)hortative, volitional, suiryōkei (推量形), tentative, presumptive, conjectural, suppositional, probable, future form (未来形, miraikei)	Shift the 〜〇 kana to the お row		見 (mi)	出 (de)	し (shi)			こ (ko)	Hortative form
Ishikei (意志形)	(co)hortative, volitional, suiryōkei (推量形), tentative, presumptive, conjectural, suppositional, probable, future form (未来形, miraikei)	言お (io)	狩ろ (karo)	見 (mi)	出 (de)	し (shi)			こ (ko)	Hortative form
Kanō dōshi (可能動詞)	kanōkei (可能形), potential, passive potential	Remove ar from the passive ending areru		Optionally remove ra from the passive ending rareru						Potential form
Kanō dōshi (可能動詞)	kanōkei (可能形), potential, passive potential	言える (ieru)	狩れる (kareru)	見(ら)れる (mi(ra)reru)	出(ら)れる (de(ra)reru)	出来る (dekiru)			こ(ら)れる ko(ra)reru	Potential form
Ren'yōkei (連用形)	infinitive, conjunctive (中止形, chūshikei), continuative, connective, adverbial	Shift the 〜〇 kana to the い row		Remove る						Infinitive form
Ren'yōkei (連用形)	infinitive, conjunctive (中止形, chūshikei), continuative, connective, adverbial	言い (ii)	狩り (kari)	見 (mi)	出 (de)	し (shi)			き (ki)	Infinitive form
Onbinkei (音便形)		Remove the 〜〇 kana, add っ, し, い or ん		見 (mi)	出 (de)	し (shi)			き (ki)	Gerund Perfective form
Onbinkei (音便形)		言っ (it/yut)	狩っ (kat)	見 (mi)	出 (de)	し (shi)			き (ki)	Gerund Perfective form

Of the nine verb bases, the shūshikei/rentaikei, meireikei, and ren'yōkei bases can be considered fully conjugated forms without needing to append inflectional suffixes. In particular, the shūshikei/rentaikei and meireikei bases do not conjugate with any inflectional suffixes. By contrast, a verb cannot be considered fully conjugated in its kateikei, mizenkei, ishikei, kanōkei, or onbinkei base alone; a compatible inflectional suffix is required for that verb construction to be grammatical.

Certain inflectional suffixes, in themselves, take on the form of verbs or i‑adjectives. These suffixes can then be further conjugated by adopting one of the verb bases, followed by the attachment of the appropriate suffix. The agglutinative nature of Japanese verb conjugation can thus make the final form of a given verb conjugation quite long. For example, the word tabesaseraretakunakatta (食べさせられたくなかった) is broken down into its component morphemes below:

食べさせられたくなかった (tabesaseraretakunakatta, "did not want to be made to eat")
tabe (食べ)	sase (させ)	rare (られ)	taku (たく)	naka'- (なかっ)	ta (た)
Mizenkei base of taberu (食べる)	Mizenkei base of the saseru (させる) causative suffix	Ren'yōkei base of the rareru (られる) passive suffix	Ren'yōkei base of the tai (たい) desiderative suffix	Past‑tense ren'yōkei base of the nai (ない) negation suffix	Inflectional suffix ta (た), marking past tense
"to eat" (Verb stem)	Causative voice: "to make someone do"	Passive voice: "to be done"	Desiderative mood: "wanting to do something"	Negation: "not", negates whatever came before	Perfective aspect: indicates completion or past tense

=== Derivative verb bases ===
There are three modern verb base forms that are considered to be derived from older forms. These are the potential, hortative, and euphonic sub‑bases, as shown in the Verb base formation table above.

As with all languages, the Japanese language has evolved to fulfil the contemporary needs of communication. The potential form of verbs is one such example. In Old Japanese and Early Middle Japanese, potential was expressed with the verb ending yu (ゆ), which was also used to express the passive voice ("to be done") and the spontaneous voice ("something happens on its own"). This evolved into the modern passive ending -(ra)reru (（ら）れる), which can similarly express potential and spontaneous senses. As usage patterns changed over time, different kinds of potential constructions emerged, such as the grammatical pattern of the rentaikei base + -koto ga dekiru (〜ことができる), and also via the kanōkei base. The historical development of the kanōkei base is disputed, however the consensus is that it stemmed from a shift wherein transitive verbs developed an intransitive sense similar to the spontaneous, passive, and potential, and these intransitive forms conjugated in the 下二段活用 (shimo nidan katsuyō, lower bigrade conjugation pattern) of the Classical Japanese of the time. The lower bigrade conjugation pattern evolved into the modern ichidan pattern in modern Japanese, and these stems for godan verbs have the same form as the hypothetical stems in the table above.

The mizenkei base that ends with -a was also used to express the hortative mood for yodan verbs (四段動詞, yodan-dōshi; "Class‑4 verbs") in Old Japanese and Middle Japanese, in combination with hortative suffix -mu (む). Sound changes caused the resulting ‑amu ending to change: /‑amu/ → /‑ãu/ → /‑au/ (like English "ow") → /‑ɔː/ (like English "aw") → /‑oː/. The post‑WWII spelling reforms updated spellings to reflect this and other sound changes, resulting in the addition of the ishikei or hortative base, ending with -o, for the hortative mood of yodan verbs. This also resulted in a reclassification of "yodan verbs" to "godan verbs" (五段動詞, godan-dōshi; "Class‑5 verbs").

The ren'yōkei base also underwent various euphonic changes specific to the perfective and infinitive (te) forms for certain verb stems, giving rise to the onbinkei or euphonic base. In the onbinkei base, the inflectional suffixes for godan verbs vary according to the last kana of the verb's ren'yōkei base.

=== The bases of suru ===
Unlike most verbs, suru (する) and its derived compounds exhibit strong irregularity in their verb bases. In some cases, some variants are preferred over the others, and such preferences vary among speakers. Roughly speaking, there are three major groups that behave similarly:

- Group A: Suru itself and compounds of it and free nouns (which are usually, but not always, spelt with two more kanji if Sino-Japanese): jikkō suru (実行する; 'practise'), toku suru (得する; 'gain'), son suru (損する; 'lose'), bikkuri suru (吃驚する; 'be startled'), janpu suru (ジャンプする; 'jump'), etc.
- Group B: Compounds with bound Sino-Japanese morphemes that behave more like godan verbs. These often have full-fledged, interchangeable godan derivatives: aisu(ru) (愛す(る); 'love'), zokusu(ru) (属す(る); 'belong'), tassu(ru) (達す(る); 'reach'), etc.
  Such a form as aisenu (愛せぬ) is supposed to be the classical Japanese equivalent to aisanai (愛さない). Compare the following translations of 1 John 3:14 ("[…] Anyone who does not love remains in death."):
  1917 classical: […] aisenu mono wa shi no uchi ni oru. ([…]愛せぬ者は死のうちに居る。)
  1955 modern: […] Aisanai mono wa, shi no uchi ni todomatte iru. ([…]愛さない者は、死のうちにとどまっている。)
  However, aisenu ("not love") as the negative of aisu(ru) ("love") would likely be confused with aisenu ("cannot love") as the negative of the potential aiseru ("can love") in modern Japanese. It is clear that aisenu is not the same as aisanu where they both occur in close proximity: Wa ga ko o aisanu mono wa arimasen. Wa ga ko sae aisenu mono ga, dō shite goshukun o aisemashō. (わが子を愛さぬ者はありません。わが子さえ愛せぬ者が、どうしてご主君を愛せましょう。; transl. No man does not love his own son. If he is not capable of loving even his own son, in what way could he ever love his lord?).
  There is great variety among Group-B verbs as to whether to choose between the godan-negative ‑san(u)/‑zu and the classical-negative ‑sen(u)/‑zu, and there are indeed cases where only contexts can clarify whether ‑sen(u)/‑zu are truly classical-negative, or actually godan-negative-potential. In general, it seems that if the Sino-Japanese stem contains a moraic obstruent as in kussuru (屈する; くっする, /kɯQsɯɾɯ/), a moraic nasal as in hansuru (反する; はんする, /haNsuru/), or lengthening mora as in kyōsuru (供する; きょうする, /kjoRsɯɾɯ/), the godan options are less preferable with all auxiliaries (including the negative ‑n(u)/‑zu), though not impossible. Thus, such forms as kussenu/kussezu (屈せぬ・屈せず; 'not bend') are more likely to be classical-negative, while such forms as aisenu/aisezu (愛せぬ・愛せず; 'cannot love') are more likely to be godan-negative-potential; and while both kussanu/kussazu (屈さぬ・屈さず; 'not bend') and aisanu/aisazu (愛さぬ・愛さず; 'not love') are unambiguously godan-negative, the former are not as likely as the latter.
- Group C: Compounds with bound Sino-Japanese morphemes that behave more like upper (i-stemmed) ichidan verbs. These often have full-fledged, interchangeable upper ichidan derivatives: ronzuru → ronjiru (論ずる→論じる; 'discuss'), ōzuru → ōjiru (応ずる→応じる; 'respond'), omonzuru → omonjiru (重んずる→重んじる; 'appreciate'), sassuru → sasshiru (察する→察しる; 'surmise'), etc.
- Group D: Compounds with bound Sino-Japanese morphemes that behave more like lower (e-stemmed) ichidan verbs. These may have full-fledged, interchangeable lower ichidan derivatives: shinzuru → shinzeru (進ずる→進ぜる; 'provide') and misuru → miseru (魅する→魅せる; 'enchant').

Across the following forms of suru within standard Japanese, an eastern dialect, while there is a dominance of the eastern vowel i as in shinai, shiyō and shiro, the once prestigious western vowel e, as in sen(u) and seyo, still has currency especially in formal or literary Japanese. Such variants as senai and sanai (both of shinai); shin(u) (of sen(u)); shō (← seu), seyō and sō (all of shiyō); sero (of shiro); and shiyo, sē and sei (all of seyo), remain dialectal or obsolete.

	suru (する) (A)	benkyō suru (勉強する) (A)	aisuru (愛する) (B)	tassuru (達する) (B & C)	sassuru (察する) (C)	shinzuru (信ずる) (C)	shinzuru (進ずる) (C & D)
Irrealis	se shi sa	benkyō se benkyō shi benkyō sa	aisa aise aishi	tasse tasshi tassa	sasse sasshi	shinji shinze	shinze shinji
Passive	sareru serareru shirareru	benkyō sareru benkyō serareru benkyō shirareru	aisareru aiserareru aishirareru	tasserareru tasshirareru tassareru	sasserareru sasshirareru	shinjirareru shinzerareru	shinzerareru shinjirareru
Potential (Note: Historically not distinguished from the passive.)	(suru koto ga) dekiru	benkyō (suru koto ga) dekiru	aiseru aise(ra)reru aishi(ra)reru aisuru koto ga dekiru aisu koto ga dekiru	tasse(ra)reru tasshi(ra)reru tasseru tassuru koto ga dekiru tassu koto ga dekiru	sasse(ra)reru sasshi(ra)reru sassuru koto ga dekiru sasshiru koto ga dekiru	shinji(ra)reru shinze(ra)reru shinjiru koto ga dekiru shinzuru koto ga dekiru	shinze(ra)reru shinji(ra)reru shinzuru koto ga dekiru shinzeru koto ga dekiru shinjiru koto ga dekiru
Causative	saseru sesaseru shisaseru	benkyō saseru benkyō sesaseru benkyō shisaseru	aisaseru aisesaseru aishisaseru	tassesaseru tasshisaseru tassaseru	sassesaseru sasshisaseru	shinjisaseru shinzesaseru	shinzesaseru shinjisaseru
Negative	shinai senu	benkyō shinai benkyō senu	aisanai aishinai aisanu aisenu	tasshinai tassanai tassenu tassanu tasshinu	sasshinai sassenu sasshinu	shinjinai shinjinu shinzenu	shinjinai shinzenai shinzenu shinjinu
Hortative	shiyō	benkyō shiyō	aisō aishiyō	tasshiyō tassō	sasshiyō	shinjiyō	shinjiyō shinzeyō
Infinitive	shi	benkyō shi	aishi	tasshi	sasshi	shinji	shinji shinze
Attributive/conclusive	suru	benkyō suru	aisuru aisu	tassuru tassu tasshiru	sassuru sasshiru	shinjiru shinzuru	shinzuru shinzeru shinjiru
Attributive/conclusive + beki	su(ru) beki	benkyō su(ru) beki	aisu(ru) beki	tassu(ru) beki tasshiru beki	sassu(ru) beki sasshiru beki	shinjiru beki shinzu(ru) beki	shinzu(ru) beki shinzeru beki shinjiru beki
Conditional	sureba	benkyō sureba	aisureba aiseba	tassureba tasseba tasshireba	sassureba sasshireba	shinjireba shinzureba	shinzureba shinzereba shinjireba
Imperative	shiro seyo	benkyō shiro benkyō seyo	aise aishiro aiseyo	tasshiro tasseyo tasshiyo tasse	sasshiro sasseyo sasshiyo	shinjiro shinjiyo shinzeyo	shinjiro shinzero shinzeyo shinjiyo

== Focus particles and nucleus splitting ==
The nucleus of a sentence, or a nuclear sentence, requires nothing more than a verb, adjective, or noun-copula phrase, to stand on its own as a complete, grammatical utterance:

- Verbal nucleus: Yobu (呼ぶ; '[subject] calls [object]'): I (will) call him, she calls me, she will call me, etc.
- Adjectival nucleus: Ōkii (大きい; '[subject] is big'): it is big, they are big, etc.
- Nominal nucleus: Hon da (本だ; '[subject] is a book'): this is a book, those are books, etc.

Notice how there are no mentions of explicit subjects or objects, whether they be nouns or pronouns, in the above examples, unlike in the possible English translations. The nucleus is the only essential part of discourse, with other information, such the subject and the object, being supplementally built on top of it:

- Yobu (呼ぶ; '[subject] calls [object]')
  - → Haha ga yobu (母が呼ぶ; 'The mother calls [object]')
  - → Kodomo o yobu (子供を呼ぶ; '[subject] calls the child')
    - → Haha ga kodomo o yobu (母が子供を呼ぶ; 'The mother calls the child')

Certain Japanese particles allow what Martin (2004:316–326) calls "nucleus splitting." When a nucleus is split, a focus particle is inserted between its infinitive and its auxiliary, the latter of which normally either fuses with the former into a single contraction, or does not surface at all:

	"Fused" nucleus	"Split" nucleus		
Verbal	yobu (呼ぶ)	yobi (呼び)	[focus particle]	suru (する; 'do')
Adjectival	ōkii (大きい)	ōkiku (大きく)	[focus particle]	aru (ある; 'exist; be')
Nominal	hon de aru (本である) → hon da (本だ)	hon de (本で)	[focus particle]	aru (ある)

Of focus particles, wa ("as for," "speaking of") subdues what comes before it to the background, while throwing focus onto what comes after; and mo ("even," "too") highlights and raises what comes before it to the foreground. In the following examples, the focused information is underlined in the Japanese original, and put in all caps in the English translations to emulate spoken stress:

wa (は)	mo (も)
yobi wa suru (呼びはする; 'I WILL call him')	yobi mo suru (呼びもする; 'I'll [even] CALL him')
ōkiku wa aru (大きくはある; 'it IS big')	ōkiku mo aru (大きくもある; 'it's [even] BIG')
hon de wa aru (本ではある; 'it IS a book')	hon de mo aru (本でもある; 'it's [even] a BOOK')

Wa ("as for," "speaking of"), commonly used to focus on negation, is often taught to foreigners as part of the nucleus, particularly in the negative copula: Hon de wa nai (本ではない; 'it's NOT a book'). The copular de wa sequence is used so frequently to focus on negation that it contracts to ja(a) in speech, and its focusing effect becomes ambiguous (see #Copulae: Conjugation table for more). De wa/ja(a) can also be used on their own as a sentence adverbial meaning "in that case" or "well then," which focuses on the following information in relation to the preceding. Wa is also used with the gerund to form a conditional clause: Uchi e kaette wa yōfuku o kikaeru (うちへ帰っては洋服を着替る; 'When I get home, I'll CHANGE CLOTHES'); Shinde wa subete oshimai desu (死んでは全てお終いです; 'When you die, it's the END OF EVERYTHING'). Like the aforementioned copular de wa, the gerundive ‑te/‑de wa also contract to ‑cha/‑ja.

Mo ("even," "too") is often used to form concessive clauses: (Note: A clause that, in English, starts with "even if/though," "although," etc.) Sore wa kodomo de mo dekiru (それは子供でもできる; 'Even a CHILD can do that'); Uten de mo yotei jikan ni shuppatsu shimasu (雨天でも予定時間に出発します; Even if it RAINS, we'll leave at the scheduled time). De mo, as a sentence adverbial means "but" or "however" ("despite what's just been mentioned"). The gerundive ‑te/‑de mo are standard concessive constructions in modern Japanese: Ame ga futte mo iku (雨が降っても行く; 'Even if it RAINS, I'll go'); Ikura nonde mo kesshite midarenai (いくら飲んでも決して乱れない; 'No matter HOW MUCH HE DRINKS, he never loses control').

== Copulae ==
The copulae are the basis of the nominal nucleus. It follows a noun, and means "[subject] is <noun>," similarly to the copula be in English. Certain nouns with descriptive meanings, called "adjectival nouns," can also precede a copula.

Of the various forms of the copulae, nara(ba) functions as a type of evidential conditional. Darō can be added to verbs and adjectives to form the modern tentative. Desu can be used as a meaningless politeness flourish with word forms that do not readily combine with the politeness auxiliary ‑masu, such as an adjective or a negative auxiliary. The past deshita and the tentative deshō are both meaningful and polite extenders to word forms that lack any mechanism to convey pastness and tentativity, namely the western negative ‑n(u).

Copula example sentences
English	Japanese	Function
I am I am justice‼	Boku ga Watashi ga seigi da‼ (僕が 私が 正義だ‼)	copularity with common nouns
To be, or not to be, that is the question:	Sei ka shi ka…… Sore ga mondai da. (生か死か……それが問題だ。)	copularity with common nouns
‘I am a servant of the Secret Fire, wielder of the flame of Anor. […]’	“Washi wa Shinpi no Hi ni tsukaeru mono, Anōru no honō no tsukaite ja.” (「わしは神秘の火に仕える者、アノールの焰の使い手じゃ。[…]」)	copularity with common nouns
You… Zura Kotarō⁉ It’s not Zura, it’s Katsuraaa‼	Omah… Zura Kotarō⁉ Zura ja nai Katsura daaa‼ (おまっ…ヅラ小太郎か⁉ ヅラじゃない 桂だァァ‼)	copularity with proper nouns
Look out! It’s the Cat! […] Catwoman’s here!	Ki o tsukero! Kyatto da! […] Kyattoūman da zo! (気をつけろ！ キャットだ！ […] キャットウーマンだぞ！)	copularity with proper nouns
Batman’s here!	Battoman wa koko da! (バットマンはここだ！)	copularity with demonstrative pronouns
To be, or not to be, I there’s the point,	Sei ka shi ka, mondai wa sore da. (生か死か、問題はそれだ。)	copularity with demonstrative pronouns
‘You were always something of a featherbrain in your youth,’ […] ‘[…] for you were a beauty in your day, Cynthia.’	“Anata wa atama ga karappo deshita yo, wakai koro wa” […] “[…] Shinshia, anata mo wakai koro wa kirei deshita mono” (「あなたは頭が空っぽでしたよ、若いころは」[…]「[…]シンシア、あなたも若いころはきれいでしたもの」)	copularity with adjectival nouns
“I have sought Mistress Mishley’s aid in tracking down the tomboy who did such a foolish thing as to hide up in a tree” “What⁉ Don’t give me that baloney!” […] Mishley is the purest of all beings in this world. […] “I’m so sorry, Mishley! I was an idiot for making you worry!”	“Ki no ue ni kakureru to yū aho na koto o shita otenbasama o sagashiateru tame ni, Mishurī Ojōsama no ochikara o karita no desu” “Nah⁉ Baka na koto o yū na!” […] Mishurī wa kono yo de ichiban kiyoraka na sonzai da. […] “Gomen Mishurī! Mishurī o shinpai saseru nante, o nēchan baka datta!” (「木の上に隠れるというアホなことをしたお転婆様を探し当てるために、ミシュリーお嬢様のお力を借りたのです」 「なっ⁉ バカなことを言うな！」 […] ミシュリーはこの世で一番清らかな存在だ。[…] 「ごめんミシュリー！ ミシュリーを心配させるなんて、お姉ちゃんバカだった！」)	copularity with adjectival nouns
“As if I needed to spell it out! There’s no way in hell Mishley, purity in human form, would get in on a plot hatched by a Hell’s messenger like you, now is there⁉” […] “Shut up, you lowly hellspawn! You’ve committed the offense of lying about what Mishley does, just go straight back to Hell――”	“Yū made mo nai! Seiren ga hito no katachi to natta Mishurī ga, omae mitai na jigoku no tsukai ga takuranda keikaku ni te o kasu wake nai darō⁉” […] “Damare gokusotsume! Mishurī no okonai o itsuwaru yō na tsumi o okashita omae wa sassa to jigoku ni kae――” (「言うまでもない！ 清廉が人の形となったミシュリーが、お前みたいな地獄の使いがたくらんだ計画に手を貸すわけないだろう⁉」 […] 「黙れ獄卒め！ ミシュリーの行いを偽るような罪を犯したお前はさっさと地獄にかえ――」)	copularity with auxiliary nouns
They say it’s a terrifying place. Many have died there. They say ascetics just keep dying because of the immensely severe asceticism. Do you wish to die too?	Asoko wa osoroshii tokoro da sō da Mō nannin mo shinde ’ru n da sō da Anmari hageshii kugyō no tame ni gyōja ga dondon shinu sō da Kimi mo shinitai no kah (あそこは恐ろしいところだそうだ もう何人も死んでるんだ そうだ あんまりはげしい苦行のために 行者がどんどん死ぬそうだ きみも死にたいのかっ)	copularity with auxiliary nouns
“Thank you. You’re cute too, Big Brother!”	“Arigatō gozaimasu. Oniisama mo kawaii desu!” (「ありがとうございます。お兄さまも可愛いです！」)	politeness
Well, it wasn't a very successful meeting.	Sō desu ne, sore wa amari seika no aru kaigi de wa arimasen deshita (そうですね、それはあまり成果のある会議ではありませんでした)	politeness and pastness
Might I ask you to go to the hospital with me?	Watashi to issho ni byōin e itte moraemasen deshō ka (私と一緒に病院へ行ってもらえませんでしょうか)	politeness and tentativity
Did you ever run into something like that kind of interest in running one’s own business in your research?	Sō yū kokojin no keiei e no iyoku mitai na mono wa, chōsa no naka de kanjirareru koto wa arimasen deshita deshō ka. (そういう個々人の経営への意欲みたいなものは、調査の中で感じられることはありませんでしたでしょうか。)	politeness, pastness and tentativity

=== Copulae: Conjugation table ===
The copulae of Japanese demonstrate suppletion, in that they combined different forms from different words into one word. The original copulae were all based on the verb ari (あり; 'to exist'), which evolved into the modern aru (ある). It needed to be preceded by one of the three particles, ni, nite → de and to, which yielded three variants, ni ari/ni aru → nari/naru, de ari/de aru → da and to ari/to aru → tari/taru, the last of which fell out of use, but did phonetically coincide with te ari/te aru → tari/taru, which in turn evolved into the modern past auxiliary ta. It also combined with adjectival roots to expand their conjugation, for example akaku arō → akakarō (赤かろう), akaku atta → akakatta (赤かった), etc.

- The original conclusive de ari, was replaced by the attributive de aru, which evolved into the informal conclusive da, and the formal conclusive de aru. In terms of formality and politeness:
  - Da is informal and impolite. Depending on specifically what precedes it, da can be perceived as abrupt or too masculine, and therefore is customarily omitted in some cases.
  - De aru is formal and nonpolite (with no inherent assumption of politeness).
  - Desu is nonformal (with no inherent assumption of formality) and polite.
  - De arimasu is formal and polite.
- Da/datta/darō are the colloquial contractions of de aru/de atta/de arō in eastern dialects (including Tokyo Japanese). Their western equivalents include ja/jatta/jarō and ya/yatta/yarō. Ja/jatta/jarō, along with other western features (‑n(u), ‑nanda, u‑onbin, etc), are occasionally used in faux-archaic speech or old people's speech rather dialectal speech; for example, the character Gandalf, an ancient wizard from The Lord of the Rings, is made to speak with a few selectively chosen western features, (Note: Ja/jatta/jaro rather than da/datta/daro, tōsan(u) rather than tōsanai, etc.) while still retaining some eastern features, (Note: Tōku rather than toō, oyobanakatta rather than oyobananda, nigero rather than nigē, etc.) in the Japanese translations (see relevant quotations in the footnotes).
- Gozaru (御座る; contracted from goza aru) is the honorific version of aru, and goza(r)imasu is the honorific version of arimasu. Gozaru has most of the forms that aru does ((de (wa)) gozaru, (de (wa)) gozaranu, (de (wa)) gozareba, etc), although it additionally undergoes a minor sound change in the polite conclusive/attributive gozarimasu → gozaimasu and the imperative gozare → gozai. Gozaimasu is authentically used in modern Japanese, while gozaru, gozarimasu(ru) and gozaimasuru are used for effect, such as in theatrical or humorous lines.
- The current attributive form of de (wa) aru is still de (wa) aru. Da additionally takes naru → na (of said nari) as its attributive form only in adjectival verbs, as in kirei na hana (綺麗な花; 'pretty flower', lit. 'a flower, which is pretty'), and after the auxiliaries sō (そう), yō (よう) and mitai (みたい), as in rikō sō na kao (利口そうな顔; 'smart-looking face', lit. 'a face, which appears smart') and kanojo no yō na hito (彼女のような人; 'someone like her', lit. 'a person, who is like her'); while the particle no is used after nouns, as in tomodachi no Yūko (友達の裕子; 'my friend Yūko', lit. 'Yūko, who is my friend') or bijin no onēsan (美人のお姉さん; 'my beautiful sister', lit. 'my sister, who is a beauty'). However, since no also expresses possession, this may cause ambiguity, as in isha no ojisan (医者のおじさん; lit. 'my uncle, who is a doctor; my doctor's uncle'); moreover, some nouns can function as either "adjectival verbs" or "nouns", and take either na or no, such as iroiro na mono/iroiro no mono (色々な物・色々の物; 'various things'). The old naru (of said nari) and taru (of said to ari/to aru → tari/taru) can still be used for literary effect, as in zetsudai naru gokitai (絶大なるご期待; 'the utmost anticipation'), Hokkaidō naru chihō (北海道なる地方; 'Hokkaido region'), isha taru hito (医者たる人; 'a person, who is known as a doctor'), kyōshi taru mono (教師たるもの; 'those who call themselves teachers'), or in such idiom as sei naru (聖なる; 'holy') or dōdō taru (堂々たる; 'splendid'). Incidentally, an ancient possessive na was fossilized in words like manako (眼; 'eyeball', lit. 'eye's child'), minato (港; 'harbor', lit. 'water's door'), tanagokoro (掌; 'palm', lit. 'hand's heart'), etc. There is also a niche distinction between Kōbe no hito (神戸の人; 'person from Kobe', lit. 'Kobe's person') and Kōbe na hito (神戸な人; 'person seeming like they could be from Kobe', lit. 'Kobe-ish person'). Na is also used before the nominalizer no, as in sobo wa hyakusai na no da (祖母は100歳なのだ; lit. 'it's a fact that my grandma is 100 years old').
- De is morphologically a gerund, for it is constructed by combining its infinitive (ni) with the gerundive particle ‑te as with any other gerund. In modern Japanese, it itself functions as both an infinitive and a gerund. When combining with aru to create finite forms, it is de that is used, not ni which is classical and merely fossilized in the attributive na(ru) (← ni aru) and the provisional nara(ba) (← ni araba). Another gerund, de atte is occasionally found in writing: Yonin wa izure mo hitonami ijō ni tsuyoi jiga no mochinushi de atte, kesshite dakyō nado shinai (四人はいずれも人並み以上に強い自我の持ち主であって、決して妥協などしない; 'Each of the four is the possessor of a stronger ego than the average man and never makes compromises').
- De and de ari are the more common infinitives: Shika shi karera wa sugureta bunka de ari goraku de aru eiga o hitori de mo ōku no hito ni misetai to doryoku shite kita dake de aru (しかし彼らは優れた文化であり娯楽である映画を一人でも多くの人に見せたいと努力してきただけである; 'But they have only endeavored to show to as many people as possible films that are outstanding culture and are entertainment'). It is rare to find ni used alone with an ordinary noun: Sore ga munensa ni wakayome wa sato e kaetta kiri modotte konai (それが無念さに若嫁は里へ帰ったきり戻ってこない; 'With that as a resentment, the bride returned to her village and would not return'); ni meaning "as," however, can be treated as an infinitive: Uchi wa okyakusama ni gaijin no kata ga ōi n de, asuparagasu, burokkorī nado no seiyō yasai ga yoku demasu (うちはお客様に外人の方が多いんで、アスパラガス、ブロッコリーなどの西洋野菜がよく出ます; 'As customers we have mostly foreigners, so lots of foreign vegetables like asparagus and broccoli are out for sale'). Other types of nouns, such as adjectival nouns (heiwa ni (平和に; 'peacefully; in a peaceful way')), auxiliary nouns (yō ni (ように; 'in a way like')), demonstrative pronouns (koko ni (ここに; 'here')) etc, can be readily paired with ni when used adverbially.
- The infinitives combine with different words, each with its own parallel:
  - de + aru → de aru ("be"), parallel with akaku + aru → akaku aru ("be red") and nomi + suru → nomi suru ("drink")
  - de + nai → de nai ("not be"), parallel with akaku + nai → akaku nai ("not be red") and nomi + shinai → nomi shinai ("not drink")
  - de ari + ‑masu → de arimasu ("be"), (Note: Some traditional descriptions also count dat in datta ("was/were"), which was historically de arita, as well as deshi in deshita.) parallel with nomi + ‑masu → nomimasu ("drink")
- The above formations allow "splitting", or adding particles like wa or mo between the infinitive forms and the following verbs, which would be impossible with da ("be"), akai ("be red") and nomu ("drink") alone:
  - da ("be"), parallel with akai ("be red") and nomu ("drink")
  - de wa aru ("be …, indeed"), parallel with akaku wa aru ("be red, indeed") and nomi wa suru ("drink, indeed")
  - de wa nai ("not be …, indeed"), parallel with akaku wa nai ("not be red, indeed") and nomi wa shinai ("not drink, indeed")
- The particles wa and mo are often added, especially to the negatives, although not required in principle. Wa puts focus on what goes after it, while mo puts focus what goes before it. In the following sentences, the focused information is underlined for the Japanese originals and the literal English translations; for the non-literal English translations, all-caps type emulates how an English speaker would emphasize the focused information.
  - Kono hen ga shizuka da. (この辺が静かだ。; lit. 'This area[, not any other area,] is quiet.', transl. THIS area is quiet.)
  - Kono hen mo shizuka da. (この辺も静かだ。; lit. 'This area, too, [along with at least another area,] is quiet.', transl. THIS area's also quiet.)
  - Kono hen wa shizuka da. (この辺は静かだ。; lit. 'This area? It's quiet.', transl. This area's QUIET.)
  - Kono hen wa shizuka de wa aru ga, fuben da. (この辺は静かではあるが、不便だ。; lit. 'This area? Being quiet? It is indeed, but it's inconvenient.', transl. This area IS quiet, but it's inconvenient)
- Sometimes de and aru can be split quite widely:
  - Ikuji nashi! So shite mattaku sono tōri de watashi wa atta no da. (意氣地なし！ そして全くその通りで私はあつたのだ。; transl. A wuss! I WAS exactly just that.)
- While de nai/arimasen are sometimes used in formal contexts, in ordinary speech ja nai/ja arimasen are used instead. In this case, even though ja is etymologically a colloquially reduced version of de wa, ja nai/arimasen are, functionally, colloquial versions of either de nai/arimasen, which focus on what comes before them, or de wa nai/arimasen which focus on nai/arimasen. Some speakers distinguish the short ja (じゃ) for de and the long jā (じゃあ) for de wa.
  - Marukusu to Renin no shinja de nai desu ka /~ ja arimasen ka (マルクスとレニンの信者でないですか・〜じゃありませんか; lit. 'Are they not believers in Marx and Lenin?', transl. Aren't they BELIEVERS in Marx and Lenin?)
  - Marukusu to Renin no shinja de wa nai desu ka /~ ja(a) arimasen ka (マルクスとレニンの信者ではないですか・〜じゃ(あ)ありませんか; lit. 'Believers in Marx and Lenin? Is that not what they are?', transl. Are they NOT believers in Marx and Lenin?)
- While de (wa) arimasen and de (wa) arimasen deshita are often recommended, de (wa) nai desu and de (wa) nakatta desu are acceptable colloquial alternatives. For the idiosyncratic de (wa) aranai and de (wa) arimashinai, see Negative: Conjugation table.
- De (wa) areba is the regular way of forming conditionals (仮定形, kateikei) in modern Japanese. Naraba (of said nari) is kept as the conditional of da, and along with taraba (of said te ari/te aru → tari/taru → ta), retains the old way of forming conditionals. See #Conditional: Conjugation table for more.
- Desu, a copula of uncertain origin, takes its missing forms from de (wa) aru and de (wa) arimasu, the latter of which is conceivably the ancestor of desu.
- Although nara(ba) (なら(ば)), darō (だろう) and deshō (でしょう) were originally conjugations of da (だ) and desu (です), they are now also used as particles or auxiliaries and can attach directly to other verbs' conclusive/attributive forms, as in kaku nara(ba) (書くなら(ば); 'if one writes'), kaku darō/deshō (書くだろう・でしょう; 'one will probably write'). Desu (or de arimasu or de gozaimasu), deshita and deshō can add politeness the negative auxiliaries ‑n(u) and ‑nai, as well as adjectives:
  - Arimasen/gozaimasen / nai desu/de arimasu/de gozaimasu / naku arimasu / nō gozaimasu ("be not")
  - Arimasen/gozaimasen deshō / nai deshō/de arimashō/de gozaimashō / naku arimashō / nō gozaimashō ("be probably not")
  - Arimasen/gozaimasen deshita / nakatta desu/de arimasu/de gozaimasu / naku arimashita / nō gozaimashita ("were not")
  - Arimasen/gozaimasen deshita deshō / nakatta deshō/de arimasu/de gozaimasu / naku arimashita deshō / nō gozaimashita deshō ("were probably not")
  - Akai desu/de arimasu/de gozaimasu / akaku arimasu / akō gozaimasu ("be red")
  - Akai deshō/de arimashō/de gozaimashō / akaku arimashō / akō gozaimashō ("be probably red")
  - Akakatta desu/de arimasu/de gozaimasu / akaku arimashita / akō gozaimashita ("were red")
  - Akakatta deshō/de arimasu/de gozaimasu / akaku arimashita deshō / akō gozaimashita deshō ("were probably red")
- As shown above, desu does not have its own negative form, and instead borrows de (wa) arimasen from de (wa) arimasu. However, the auxiliary ‑n in de (wa) arimasen in turn does not have its own past and tentative form, therefore deshita and deshō have to be added. The past tentative ‑tarō is infrequent, thus instead of deshitarō, deshita deshō is preferred.

Stems without aru
		Uncontracted	Contracted		
Infinitive		ni (に)			
Infinitive		de (で)			
Gerund		nite (にて)	de (で)		
Attributive		no (の)			
Stems with aru
		Plain		Polite with ‑masu	
		Uncontracted	Contracted	Uncontracted	Contracted
Irrealis		de (wa) ara‑ (で(は)あら〜) (Note: For more specific derivatives, see mentions of aru (ある) in the following sections.) ja(a) ara‑ (じゃ(あ)あら〜)	^{†}dara‑ (だら〜) (Note: No longer audible on the surface level as it fused with the tentative auxiliary ‑u to make the form below. Historically still spelt out in modern literature before spelling reform, as in だらう, though the actual pronunciation was still darō.)^{†}jara‑ (じゃら〜) (Note: Historically also spelt ぢやら or じやら before spelling reform.)}^{†}yara‑ (やら〜)	de (wa) arimase‑ (で(は)ありませ〜) (Note: Only audible in the negative de (wa) arimasen(u) shown above. When combining with the tentative auxiliary ‑u, it became the form shown below. Historically still spelt out in modern literature before spelling reform, as in ませう, though the actual pronunciation was still mashō.) ja(a) arimase‑ (じゃ(あ)ありませ〜)	^{†}dese‑ (でせ〜) (Note: No longer audible on the surface level as it fused with the tentative auxiliary ‑u to make the form below. Historically still spelt out in modern literature before spelling reform, as in でせう, though the actual pronunciation was still deshō.)
Infinitive		de (wa) ari (で(は)あり) ja(a) ari (じゃ(あ)あり)			
Gerund		de (wa) atte (で(は)あって) ja(a) atte (じゃ(あ)あって)		de (wa) arimashite (で(は)ありまして) ja(a) arimashite (じゃ(あ)ありまして)	deshite (でして)
Conclusive		de (wa) aru (で(は)ある) ja(a) aru (じゃ(あ)ある)	da (だ) ja (じゃ) ya (や)	de (wa) arimasu(ru) (で(は)あります(る)) ja(a) arimasu(ru) (じゃ(あ)あります(る))	desu (です)
Attributive		de (wa) aru (で(は)ある) ja(a) aru (じゃ(あ)ある)		de (wa) arimasu(ru) (で(は)あります(る)) ja(a) arimasu(ru) (じゃ(あ)あります(る))	desu (です)
Attributive		^{†}ni (wa) aru (に(は)ある) (Note: Etymologically only. Currently, instances of ni (wa) aru do not involve the copular ni, but the locative ni, meaning A ni aru actually means "that is in A" rather than "that is A".)	na(ru) (な(る))		
Negative	‑nai (〜ない)	de (wa) nai (で(は)ない) ja(a) nai (じゃ(あ)ない)		de (wa) nai de arimasu(ru) (で(は)ないであります(る)) ja(a) nai de arimasu(ru) (じゃ(あ)ないであります(る))	de (wa) nai desu (で(は)ないです) ja(a) nai desu (じゃ(あ)ないです)
Negative	‑nai (〜ない)	de (wa) nai (で(は)ない) ja(a) nai (じゃ(あ)ない)		de (wa) naku arimasu(ru) (で(は)なくあります(る)) ja(a) naku arimasu(ru) (じゃ(あ)なくあります(る))	
Negative	‑nai (〜ない)	de (wa) aranai (で(は)あらない) ja(a) aranai (じゃ(あ)あらない)		de (wa) arimashinai (で(は)ありましない) ja(a) arimashinai (じゃ(あ)ありましない)	
Negative	‑n (〜ん)	de (wa) aran (で(は)あらん) ja(a) aran (じゃ(あ)あらん)		de (wa) arimasen (で(は)ありません) ja(a) arimasen (じゃ(あ)ありません)	
Negative	‑nu (〜ぬ)	de (wa) aranu (で(は)あらぬ) ja(a) aranu (じゃ(あ)あらぬ)		de (wa) arimasenu (で(は)ありませぬ) ja(a) arimasenu (じゃ(あ)ありませぬ)	
Negative	‑zu (〜ず)	de (wa) arazu (で(は)あらず) ja(a) arazu (じゃ(あ)あらず)		de (wa) arimasezu (で(は)ありませず) ja(a) arimasezu (じゃ(あ)ありませず)	
Perfective		de (wa) atta (で(は)あった) ja(a) atta (じゃ(あ)あった)	datta (だった) jatta (じゃった) yatta (やった)	de (wa) arimashita (で(は)ありました) ja(a) arimashita (じゃ(あ)ありました)	deshita (でした)
Perfective negative	‑nakatta (〜なかった)	de (wa) nakatta (で(は)なかった) ja(a) nakatta (じゃ(あ)なかった)		de (wa) nakatta de arimasu(ru) (で(は)なかったであります(る)) ja(a) nakatta de arimasu(ru) (じゃ(あ)なかったであります(る))	de (wa) nakatta desu (で(は)なかったです) ja(a) nakatta desu (じゃ(あ)なかったです)
Perfective negative	‑nakatta (〜なかった)	de (wa) nakatta (で(は)なかった) ja(a) nakatta (じゃ(あ)なかった)		de (wa) naku arimashita (で(は)なかくありました) ja(a) naku arimashita (じゃ(あ)なくありました)	
Perfective negative	‑nakatta (〜なかった)	de (wa) aranakatta (で(は)あらなかった) ja(a) aranakatta (じゃ(あ)あらなかった)		de (wa) arimashinakatta (で(は)ありましなかった) ja(a) arimashinakatta (じゃ(あ)ありましなかった)	
Perfective negative	‑n deshita (〜んでした)			de (wa) arimasen deshita (で(は)ありませんでした) ja(a) arimasen deshita (じゃ(あ)ありませんでした)	
Perfective negative	‑nu deshita (〜ぬでした)			de (wa) arimasenu deshita (で(は)ありませぬでした) ja(a) arimasenu deshita (じゃ(あ)ありませぬでした)	
Perfective negative	‑nanda (〜なんだ)	de (wa) arananda (で(は)あらなんだ) ja(a) arananda (じゃ(あ)あらなんだ)		de (wa) arimasenanda (で(は)ありませなんだ) ja(a) arimasenanda (じゃ(あ)ありませなんだ)	
Conditional		^{†}ni (wa) araba (に(は)あら(ば)) (Note: Etymologically only.)	nara(ba) (なら(ば))	de (wa) arimaseba (で(は)ありませば) ja(a) arimaseba (じゃ(あ)ありませば)	
Conditional		de (wa) areba (で(は)あれば) ja(a) areba (じゃ(あ)あれば)		de (wa) arimasureba (で(は)ありますれば) ja(a) arimasureba (じゃ(あ)ありますれば)	
Conditional		de (wa) aru nara(ba) (で(は)あるなら(ば)) ja(a) aru nara(ba) (じゃ(あ)あるなら(ば))		de (wa) arimasu nara(ba) (で(は)ありますなら(ば)) ja(a) arimasu nara(ba) (じゃ(あ)ありますなら(ば))	
Tentative		de (wa) arō (で(は)あろう) ja(a) arō (じゃ(あ)あろう)	darō (だろう) jarō (じゃろう) yarō (やろう)	de (wa) arimashō (で(は)ありましょう) ja(a) arimashō (じゃ(あ)ありましょう)	deshō (でしょう)
Tentative		de (wa) aru darō (で(は)あるだろう) ja(a) aru darō (じゃ(あ)あるだろう)		de (wa) arimasu darō (で(は)ありますだろう) ja(a) arimasu darō (じゃ(あ)ありますだろう)	
Tentative		de (wa) aru de arō (で(は)あるであろう) ja(a) aru de arō (じゃ(あ)あるであろう)			
Tentative		de (wa) aru deshō (で(は)あるでしょう) ja(a) aru deshō (じゃ(あ)あるでしょう)		de (wa) arimasu deshō (で(は)ありますでしょう) ja(a) arimasu deshō (じゃ(あ)ありますでしょう)	
Tentative		de (wa) aru de arimashō (で(は)あるでありましょう) ja(a) aru de arimashō (じゃ(あ)あるでありましょう)			
Imperative		de (wa) are (で(は)あれ) ja(a) are (じゃ(あ)あれ)		de (wa) arimase (で(は)ありませ) ja(a) arimase (じゃ(あ)ありませ)	

=== Copulae: Grammatical compatibility ===
Derived from aru and arimasu, the copulae can have all the forms that these verbs are capable of having. Certain affirmative conclusive and attributive forms have contracted, especially in speech, such as de aru → da/ja and de arimasu → desu; the negative forms remain uncontracted, meaning there is no such form as *daran or *desen.

== Imperative ==
The imperative usually expresses the speaker's wish. When directed at a specific sentient agent, such as a human or an animal, it functions as a command, an instruction, or a motivational statement that compels the agent to realize the wish. Plain commands with non-honorific verbs (which are the majority of verbs) towards people in particular are terse, and can be softened by the imperatives of verbs of favor, such as (o)kure ((御)呉れ) and kudasai(mase) (下さい(ませ); lit. 'do me/us a favor!') following the main verb's gerund, although for colloquial brevity, the favor verbs can contract as in itte okure → ittokure (行っておくれ→行っとくれ; '[do me a favor and] go!'), or be elliptically omitted as in itte kudasai → itte (行ってください→行って; '[do me a favor and] please go!'). Another option is to use the imperative of the honorific verb nasai(mase) (為さい(ませ); lit. 'do!') following the main verb's infinitive.

When not directed at a specific sentient agent, but rather the general idea of an agent ("let women/men/dogs/cats/etc be/do something," "may you rest in peace"), a non-sentient agent ("let rain/snow fall," "let wind blow"), or nothing ("peace be unto you"), the wish becomes impersonal and does not have the abrupt force of a command. Whether the agent is sentient or not, and specific or not, it can be optionally marked with the vocative particle yo (similar to the English o). Imperatives can also be part of a concessive clause similarly to the English subjunctive ("whatever it be", "be it this or that", "come rain or shine").

Imperative form example sentences
English	Japanese	Function
“Class started! Sit down, you dogs!”	“Jugyō o hajimeru ze. Suware! Inudomo!” (「授業を始めるぜ。座れ！ 犬ども！」)	plain command
“We are camping here tonight. Eat dinner and go to sleep early.” […] “Rise, wake up your men at once. Quietly, without making any noise.”	“Konban wa koko de yaei to suru. Hayaku meshi o kutte, hayaku neyo” […] “Okiyo, sugu ni hei o okose. Monooto o tatezu shizuka ni okosu no da” (「今晩はここで野営とする。早く飯を食って、早く寝よ」 […] 「起きよ、すぐに兵を起こせ。物音を立てず静かに起こすのだ」)	plain command
“O wind, blow, rage! Blow!”	“Kaze yo, fuke, areyo! Fuke yo!”―― (「風よ、吹け、荒れよ！ 吹けよ！」――)	plain command
“Wreck that mountain castle! Make it rain! Make the wind blow!”	“Ano yama no shiro o kuzushite shimae! Ame yo fure. Kaze yo fuke.” (「あの山の城をくずしてしまへ！ 雨よ降れ。風よ吹け。」)	plain command
All you bastards that crushed her‼ Die, die, just die‼ Bomba‼ Kill them‼ All of them‼	Sensei o oshitsubushita yatsura‼ Minna shine Shine Shinjimaeh Bonba‼ Yatsura o koroseh Hitori nokorazu korosu n da‼ (先生をおしつぶしたやつら‼みんな死ね 死ね 死んじまえっ ボンバ‼やつらを殺せっ ひとリのこらず殺すんだ‼)	plain command
Drop dead, Kenneth! You die too, Doctor‼	Kenesu shine Sensei mo shinjae‼ (ケネス死ね 先生も死んじゃえ‼)	plain command
If not, think of your own father for a change!	Sa mo nakerya kisama, jibun no chichi no koto o kangaete mo miro! (さもなけりや貴樣、自分の父のことを考へても見ろ！)	plain command
[Do me a favor and] stop making things worse, I beg of you!	Kore ijō koto o aradatenai de kure, tanomu yo (これ以上事を荒立てないでくれ、頼むよ)	plain command
[Do me a favor and] please call me “Satchan.”	Watashi o “Satchan” to yonde kudasai (私を「さっちゃん」と呼んでください)	plain command
[Do me a favor and] please make use of this elevator.	Dō zo kochira no erebētā goriyō kudasaimase (どうぞこちらのエレベーターをご利用くださいませ)	plain command
Read the contract well before stamping.	Ōin suru mae ni keiyakusho o yoku yominasai (押印する前に契約書をよく読みなさい)	plain command
Welcome home!	Okaerinasaimase (お帰りなさいませ) (Note: Literally, "come home, please!". Okaerinasai(mase) is used idiomatically as a greeting to a coresident who has just come home. It can be colloquially reduced to okaennasai, okainnasai, or just okaeri. Other idiomatic phrases with ‑nasai(mase) include oyasumi(nasai) (お休み(なさい); lit. 'rest, please!'; transl. sleep well; good night), gomen (nasai) (御免(なさい); lit. 'forgive me, please!'; transl. I'm sorry; my apologies), etc.)	plain command
Don’t make fun of gossip shows. Don’t jeer at the “voyeur’s spirit”.	Waido shō o baka ni suru nakare. “Yajiuma seishin” o warau nakare, de aru. (ワイドショーをバカにするなかれ。「やじうま精神」を笑うなかれ、である。)	plain command
STOP (Note: A stop sign.)	TOMARE (止まれ)	instructional command
Read the following passage and answer the questions.	Tsugi no bun o yonde toi ni kotaeyo. (次の文を読んで問いに答えよ。)	instructional command
[…] ⑦ Thou shalt not engage in road rage. ⑧ Show proper decorum to thy fellow drivers. […]	[…] ⑦ Okoru nakare. ⑧ Untensha dōshi reigi tadashiku are. […] ([…]⑦怒るなかれ．⑧運転者同士礼義正しくあれ．[…])	instructional command
New PR member, do your best!	Kōhō shin-menbā ganbare! (広報新メンバー頑張れ！)	motivational command
I won’t let you die‼………… Live, for me‼	Shinu koto wa yurusan‼………… Ore no tame ni ikiro‼ (死ぬことは許さん‼…………俺のために生きろ‼)	motivational command
Stay hungry! Stay foolish! (Note: A quote attributed to Steve Jobs.)	Hangurī de are! Oroka de are! (ハングリーであれ！愚かであれ！)	motivational command
If you’re strong, stay strong till the end! If you’re weak, stay weak till the end!	Tsuyokereba, aku made mo tsuyoku are! Yowakereba, aku made mo yowaku are! (强ければ、あくまでも强くあれ！ 弱ければ、飽くまでも弱くあれ！)	motivational command
[…] Be just! Be strong! Be good! Show strength!	[…] Tadashikare; Tsuyokare Yokare Chikara are ([…]正しかれ 強かれ 善かれ 力あれ)	motivational command
Let it rain‼ […] Rain, storm……‼ One more time………… Keep pouring for just one more time, please‼	Ame yo fure‼ […] Ame yo arashi yo……‼ Mō ichido………… Semete mō ichido furitsuzuite okure‼ (雨よ降れ‼[…]雨よ 嵐よ……‼もう一度…………せめてもう一度降り続いておくれ‼)	literary wish
God said, “Let there be a great void between the waters, let it separate water from water.”	Kami wa iwareta. “Mizu no naka ni ōzora are. Mizu to mizu o wakeyo.” (神は言われた。「水の中に大空あれ。水と水を分けよ。」)	literary wish
[…] heaven bear witness, […] God’s peace be with him. […] Heav’n’s peace be with him: […] peace be with him.	[…] ten mo shōran are, […] Ā, Kami no heiwa yo, waga chichi to tomo ni are! […] Ten no heiwa yo, kare to tomo ni are! […] Ā, kare ni heiwa are! (天も照覧あれ、[…]あゝ、神の平和よ、わが父と共にあれ！ […]天の平和よ、彼れと共にあれ！ […]あゝ、彼れに平和あれ！)	literary wish
A plaything let woman be, pure and fine like the precious stone, illumined with the virtues of a world not yet come.	Josei wa omocha de are, kiyoku utsukushiku are. Mada sonzai shinai sekai no toku ni yotte terasareta hōseki ni hitoshiku are! (女性はおもちゃであれ、清く美しくあれ。まだ存在しない世界の徳によって照らされた宝石にひとしくあれ！)	literary wish
May the victims’ souls rest in eternal peace.	Giseisha no mitama yo, eikyū ni yasukare. (犠牲者の御霊よ、永久に安かれ。)	literary wish
Lest Darkness Fall; lit. 'Darkness, Don't Fall'	Yami yo ochiru nakare (闇よ落ちるなかれ)	literary wish
believe it or not; would you believe it; lo and behold; wait for it; get this; lit. 'don't be surprised'	odoroku nakare (驚くなかれ)	literary wish
The way of life of someone who has gone all the way through with anything, be it good or bad, is beautiful.	Yoi ni shiro, warui ni shiro, nani ka o kanryō shita ningen no ikikata wa, utsukushii. (善いにしろ、惡いにしろ、何かを完了した人間の活き方は、美しい。)	concession
Whether it’s the “ability to not miss the moment nature smiles” or “serendipity”, I’d say a state of heightened sensitivity when it happens is essential.	Kono “shizen ga hohoemu toki o minogasanai chikara” ni seyo, “serendipiti” ni seyo, sono toki no kansei ga takamatte iru to yū jōtai ga jūyō da to omotte imasu. (この「自然が微笑むときを見逃さない力」にせよ、「セレンディピティ」にせよ、その時の感性が高まっているという状態が重要だと思っています。)	concession
in any event/case; anyway	izure ni shiro/seyo (いずれにしろ・せよ)	concession
Obviously, you’re free to pamper and dote on your own pet however you want to, whether it’s a dog, a cat or any other animal.	Mochiron, inu de are neko de are sono ta no dōbutsu de are, jibun no petto o muyami yatara ni amayakashite kawaigaru no wa, sono hito no jiyū de aru. (もちろん、犬であれ猫であれその他の動物であれ、自分のペットをむやみやたらに甘やかしてかわいがるのは、その人の自由である。)	concession
[…] knowing full well that whatever they are, be they the Vietnam War or a homicide, won’t just come flying out at you from that convex glass screen that is as warm as a hand warmer if you touch it a little bit, […]	[…] so shite Betonamu Sensō de gozare, hitogoroshi de gozare, ano chotto te o fureru to kairo hodo ni atsui totsumen garasu yori kochira e wa, zettai ni tobidashite kuru koto wa nai to shitte shimaeba, […] ([…]そしてベトナム戰爭でござれ、人殺しでござれ、あのちよつと手を觸れると懷爐ほどに熱い凸面ガラスよりこちらへは、絕對に飛び出してくることはないと知つてしまへば、[…])	concession
His elder brothers leave their village with their circles for new settlements, be they far or near.	Anitachi wa nakamatachi to issho ni, tōkare chikakare, mura o hanarete arata na tochi de seikatsu o suru. (兄たちは仲間たちと一緒に，遠かれ近かれ，村を離れて新たな土地で生活をする。)	concession
Come rain or wind, as Beethoven roamed the outskirts of Vienna without a care about the weather, […]	Ame yo fure, kaze mo fuke, Wīn no kōgai o, otenki kamawazu ni hōkō shita Bētōven wa, […] (雨よ降れ、風も吹け、ウィーンの郊外を、お天氣構はずに彷徨したベートーヴェンは、[…])	concession

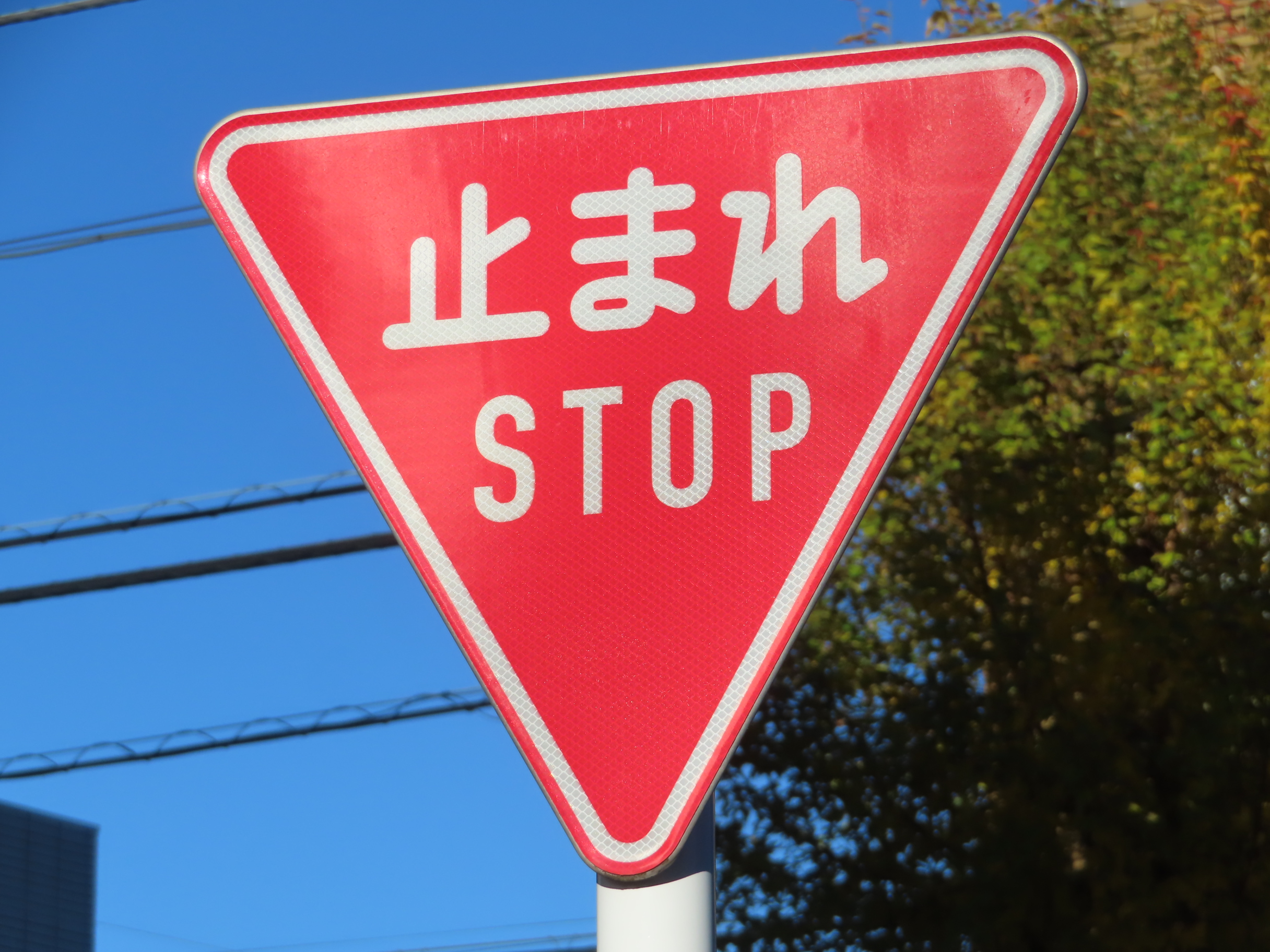
止まれ STOP signs in Japan use the imperative form of to stop (止まる) to command mandatory action.

=== Imperative: Conjugation table ===
The honorific godan verbs are originally osshare (おっしゃれ), kudasare (下され), nasare (為され), gozare (御座れ), just like other godan/yodan (四段) verbs, though *irasshare (いらっしゃれ) was not found. These forms are obsolescent and only used for special effect, such as in advertisements. Historically, honorific verbs were nidan (二段) rather than godan/yodan, and western imperative forms like iraserareyo (いらせられよ; → irasshai), ōserareyo (仰せられよ; → osshai), kudasareyo/kudasarei (下されよ・下されい; → kudasai), nasareyo (為されよ; → nasai) are attested. From these nidan verbs, apart from the godan offshoots, there still exist ichidan equivalents. Some rural eastern dialects still have nasaro (為さろ).

With non-godan verbs, there are two imperative forms, one ending in ‑ro and one in ‑yo. ‑Ro has been characterized as used for speech, while ‑yo as used for writing. In actuality, this corresponds to a difference between modern Japanese (口語, kōgo; lit. 'oral language') based on the eastern Tokyo Japanese dialect, (Note: Although ‑ro is not unheard of in western and southern Japan.) and Classical Japanese (文語, bungo; lit. 'literary language'), various literary stages of premodern Japanese based on western dialects. Both ro and yo were interjectional particles in Old Japanese, (Note: The author uses the term "central" rather than "western" for the once capital Nara, now located in Kansai.) and were sometimes optional, sometimes obligatory with non-godan verbs. ‑Yo became obligatory with non-godan verbs toward Early Middle Japanese, and its reduced variant ‑i arose during Late Middle Japanese. (Note: Compare the alternative forms of joi/ii (良い), yuku/iku (行く).) Historically and dialectally, mi-yo/mi-i/mi-ro/mi (見よ・見い・見ろ・見; 'look!'), oki-yo/oki-i/oki-ro/oki (起きよ・起きい・起きろ・起き; 'get up!'), ke-yo/ke-i/ke-ro/ke (蹴よ・蹴い・蹴ろ・蹴; 'kick!'), (Note: This verb is primarily godan, therefore the more common imperative is actually kere.) ake-yo/ake-i/ake-ro/ake (開けよ・開けい・開けろ・開け; 'open!') (all ichidan), se-yo/shi-yo/se-i/shi-i/se-ro/shi-ro/se/shi (せよ・しよ・せい・しい・せろ・しろ・せ・し; suru, 'do!') and ko-yo/ki-yo/ko-i/ki-i/ko-ro/ki-ro/ko/ki (来よ・来い・来ろ・来; kuru, 'come!') were all possible, with ‑yo and ‑i being the western forms, and ‑ro being the eastern form. The division between western ‑yo/‑i and eastern ‑ro still exists today. According to a 1991 survey:

- ‑Ro dominates eastern dialects.
- ‑Yo is found mostly in central Chūbu and eastern Kyushu.
- ‑I dominates western dialects in Honshu and Shikoku, and marginally in Shitamachi, Tokyo.
- ‑Re, likely as a shortened ‑ro‑i, is found in the northernmost dialects in Hokkaido and the southernmost ones in Kyushu.
- Shiro ("do!") dominates eastern dialects, while sē does western dialects. Seyo and shiyo concentrate in central Chūbu, while sero and sere do in western Kyushu.
- There exist such fused forms as myo(o) (← miyo, "look!"), okyo(o) (← okiyo, "rise!"), akyo(o) (← akeyo, "open!") and sho(o) (← seyo, "do!") in Shizuoka Prefecture and some surrounding areas.
- Koi ("come!") occurs consistently across Japan, although kō has a strong presence in the east. There is a concentration of kē and ke in Kyushu. Koyo is rare in contemporary Japanese dialects, despite being the standard form in classical Japanese. According to another account, koro occurs in an Akita dialect, while kiro is found in Ibaraki. Other variants include kiyo, kī, kui, keyo, etc.
- In some dialects, okiro(o), akero(o), nero(o), koro(o), shiro(o) are actually hortative forms, not imperative forms. The eastern imperative kō also resembles the western hortative of the same verb.

In modern Tokyo Japanese (eastern, specifically Yamanote Japanese), yo largely displaced ro in non-imperative contexts. Yo can be optionally added to modern imperative forms with no historical ‑yo, as in kake yo (書けよ; 'write!'), miro yo (見ろよ), shiro yo (しろよ), koi yo (来いよ); ro can no longer be used this way, although historically it used to occasionally be, as with yodan imperatives like oke ro (置けろ; 'put!') or yome ro (読めろ; 'read!'). Although ‑yo imperatives already contain ‑yo and are primarily "written," it is not impossible for them to be followed by another colloquial yo, as in Kura o akeyo yo (倉を開けよよ; 'Open the storehouse, would you?') or Mō neyo yo (もう寝よよ; 'Just sleep already, would you?'). Apart from the difference between eastern and western dialects, there exists a register difference between ‑yo and ‑ro within standard Japanese. ‑Yo, as the more prestigious classical form of the former western capitals (Nara, Kyoto and Osaka), is still used in formal instructions, such as on test forms, in academic questions, on signage, in formal or polite quoted commands or concessive clauses (spoken or written), etc. On the other hand, ‑ro, as the more colloquially common form, has a connotation of rudeness. (Note: The author argues that the imperative forms of most verbs are inherently rude in speech, barring those of honorific verbs which are presumed to be polite, such as irasshai (いらっしゃい; 'come, please!'), asobase (遊ばせ; 'let do/be, please!'), kudasai (下さい; 'give me, please!'). The problem is that, with the sole exception of goranjiro (御覧じろ; 'look, please!'), most of these verbs' conjugations (yodan/godan) have nothing to do with ‑ro (non-yodan/godan only), giving ‑ro an unavoidable connotation of rudeness. ‑Yo, on the other hand, is associated with classical Japanese (the "written" language) and therefore is the only appropriate option in formal contexts, even in speech.)

Unlike with most ichidan verbs, ‑ro is optional (possibly dialectal) with kure (呉れ; 'give (me/us)!') and its honorific version okure (御呉れ). Kurero emerged in Edo Japanese during the late Edo period. Yo and i are optionally added, just as to any other imperative form.

Despite originally having the same conjugation as suru, the imperative form of ‑masu(ru) is not *‑mashiro. However, there used to be ‑mase i, with i being the western reduced form of yo. ‑Mase yo exists, though not mandatorily like seyo, but only as ‑mase optionally followed by yo. ‑Mashi is a later variant, characteristic of Shitamachi. It used to be common during the Meiji era, but now has a connotation of unrefined speech. ‑Mase and ‑mashi are meant to be used with honorific verbs, as in irasshaimase (いらっしゃいませ), nasaimase (為さいませ), asobashimase (遊ばしませ), meshiagarimase (召し上がりませ), etc, and not with ordinary verbs like *kakimase (書きませ) or *arukimase (歩きませ).

The modern western ‑i imperative has made its way to Tokyo in the "downtown" region of Shitamachi. (Note: Martin translated Shitamachi literally as "downtown," but the name is about geographic height, not southernness as referenced by the English term downtown. The economic and cultural prestige associated with the English downtown is actually located in the higher region of Yamanote.) When it is preceded by the vowel e, the resulting form is ē, ei or even e, in keeping with the common realizations of such combination (see Japanese phonology § Vowel sequences and long vowels), hence se(e)/sei (= shiro/seyo) and ake(e)/akei (= akero/akeyo). In Kyushu, koi can be similarly smoothed out into ke(e) (compare the Tokyo variant sugē of sugoi (凄い; 'awesome'); more at #Imperfective: Conjugation table). Like yo, i can further attach to, among others, godan/yodan imperatives, as well as eastern ‑ro imperatives, for example in “Ya, batta da. Ōbatta tore ih.” (「や、バッタだ。大バッタとれいッ。」; '“Look, a grasshopper! Catch the big grasshopper!”'), totto to oriro i. (とっととおりろい。; 'get off quickly!'), Akero i = Akero yo (開けろい; 'Open up!'), etc; the particle ya, which can otherwise follow imperatives just like yo, with a potential masculine ring, as in Yose ya i (止せやい; 'Cut it out!'), Hakkiri ie ya i (はっきり言えやい; 'Speak clearly!'), etc; and negative commands with na following conclusives, as in Yokei na kuchidashi o suru na i. (よけいな口だしをするない。; 'Don’t butt in needlessly!'). It is also found in non-imperative constructions such as ka i (question marker), da i (copula), ‑ta/‑da i (perfect), although it has been said to be a variant of ne in these cases rather than of yo.

The older and more classical koyo ("come!") is rare in modern spoken dialects, but it was sometimes used as the written version of koi; for example, the linguist Kasuga Masaji used koyo while analyzing nursery rhymes that contain koi.

Gozai and gozare are used as a more polite way to say "come!" instead of koi (来い). They also occur in the concessive idiom nan de mo gozai/gozare (lit. 'come anything', transl. anything goes; anything's good; anything imaginable), which is synonymous with nan de mo koi. De gozare is a more polite equivalent to de are.

Are and de (wa) are have limited use in formal contexts, for example Kami mo shōran are (神も照覧あれ; 'may God be my witness'), hikari are (光あれ; 'let there be light'), Ito takaki tokoro ni wa eikō, Kami ni are, chi ni wa heiwa, mikokoro ni kanau hito ni are. (いと高きところには栄光、神にあれ、地には平和、御心に適う人にあれ。; 'In the highest realm, glory be unto God, on earth, peace be unto those who earn his grace.'), itsu mo Kami ni shitagatte are. (いつも神に従ってあれ。; 'always be obedient to God.'), shōjiki de are (正直であれ; 'be honest'). De (wa) are also has a concessive use, as in Riyū wa nan de are, bōryoku wa yoku nai yo. (理由は何であれ，暴力はよくないよ。; 'No matter the reason, violence is not good.'), Nan no heya de are, mō koko ni tomete morau hoka wa nai (何の部屋であれ、もうここに泊めてもらうほかはない; 'Whatever the room may be, we have no choice but to stay here.'). This has been linked to a probable contraction from the identically sounding conditional base, de are, preceding the concessive particle ‑do, as in de aredo. However, unambiguously imperative bases in ni seyo and ni shiro also have concessive uses, as in Sanka suru ni seyo, shinai ni seyo, toriaezu renraku o kudasai. (参加するにせよ，しないにせよ，とりあえず連絡を下さい。; 'Whether you partake or not, please get in touch soon.') and Soba ni shiro, udon ni shiro, menrui nara nan de mo ii n da. (そばにしろ，うどんにしろ，麺類なら何でもいいんだ。; 'Soba, udon, whatever, any kind of noodles will do.')

Unlike are, adjectival imperative forms derived from fusions with it (‑ku are → ‑kare) seem to be used mostly for concession, as in ōkare sukunakare (多かれ少なかれ; 'be there more or less'), takakare yasukare (高かれ安かれ; 'be it expensive or cheap'), tsuyokare yowakare (強かれ弱かれ; 'be it strong or weak'), osokare hayakare (遅かれ早かれ; 'be it later or sooner'), yokare ashikare (良かれ悪しかれ; 'be it good or bad'), tōkare chikakare (遠かれ近かれ; 'be it far or near'), etc and occasionally for elevated wishes, as in Yasukare (安かれ; transl. May you be at peace) (Note: Yasui used to mean "be at peace", but apart from this imperative form, this meaning is now uncommon.) or Sachi ōkare (幸多かれ; transl. Best of luck to you). The exceptional nakare ("let there not be") expresses elevated and/or motivational negative commands or wishes, as in Ogoru nakare! Jimintō (驕るなかれ！自民党; transl. Do not be prideful! O, Liberal Democratic Party), Taka ga benpi to yū nakare (高が便秘と言うなかれ; transl. Don't say it's just constipation), etc. The phrase koto nakare (事なかれ; lit. 'let there be no incident') is used in koto nakare shugi (事なかれ主義; 'principle of not rocking the boat'). Nakare behaves syntactically like the negative imperative particle na, which is similarly placed after an attributive/conclusive verb, thus ogoru na (驕るな; 'don't be prideful'), yū na (言うな; 'don't say'), etc. Unfused ‑ku are forms have also been found, as in kiyoku are (清くあれ; 'be pure!').

Dictionary form	Pattern			Imperative form
Godan and pseudo-yodan verbs
結う (yuu/yū, fasten)	結う	結え		結え (yue, fasten!/may one fasten)
言(い)う (yū, say)	ゆう	いえ		言え (ie, say!/may one say)
勝つ (katsu, win)	勝つ	勝て		勝て (kate, win!/may one win)
狩る (karu, hunt)	狩る	狩れ		狩れ (kare, hunt!/may one hunt)
有る (aru, exist)	有る	有れ		有れ (are, may there be)
貸す (kasu, lend)	貸す	貸せ		貸せ (kase, lend!/may one lend)
愛す (aisu, love)	愛す	愛せ		愛せ (aise, love!/may one love)
達す (tassu, reach)	達す	達せ		達せ (tasse, reach!/may one reach)
書く (kaku, write)	書く	書け		書け (kake, write!/may one write)
嗅ぐ (kagu, smell)	嗅ぐ	嗅げ		嗅げ (kage, smell!/may one smell)
呼ぶ (yobu, call)	呼ぶ	呼べ		呼べ (yobe, call!/may one call)
読む (yomu, read)	読む	読め		読め (yome, read!/may one read)
死ぬ (shinu, die)	死ぬ	死ね		死ね (shine, die!/may one die)
Honorific godan verbs
下さる (kudasaru, give)	下さる	下さい 下され		下さい (kudasai, give!/may one give) 下され (kudasare)
為さる (nasaru, do)	為さる	為さい 為され		為さい (nasai, do!/may one do) 為され (nasare)
御座る (gozaru, exist/come)	御座る	御座い 御座れ		御座い (gozai, may there be/come!/may one come) 御座れ (gozare)
Ichidan verbs
見る (miru, look)	見~~る~~	見	ろ よ い	見ろ (miro, look!/may one look) 見よ (miyo) 見い (mii)
達しる (tasshiru, reach)	達し~~る~~	達し	ろ よ い	達しろ (tasshiro, reach!/may one reach) 達しよ (tasshiyo) 達しい (tasshii)
達しる (tasshiru, reach)	達し~~る~~	達せ	よ い	達せよ (tasseyo, reach!/may one reach) 達せい (tassei)
察しる (sasshiru, guess)	察し~~る~~	察し	ろ よ い	察しろ (sasshiro, guess!/may one guess) 察しよ (sasshiyo) 察しい (sasshii)
察しる (sasshiru, guess)	察し~~る~~	察せ	よ い	察せよ (sasseyo, guess!/may one guess) 察せい (sassei)
信じる (shinjiru, believe)	信じ~~る~~	信じ	ろ よ い	信じろ (shinjiro, believe!/may one believe) 信じよ (shinjiyo) 信じい (shinjii)
信じる (shinjiru, believe)	信じ~~る~~	信ぜ	よ い	信ぜよ (shinzeyo, believe!/may one believe) 信ぜい (shinzei)
進じる (shinjiru, give)	進じ~~る~~	進じ	ろ よ い	進じろ (shinjiro, give!/may one give) 進じよ (shinjiyo) 進じい (shinjii)
進じる (shinjiru, give)	進じ~~る~~	進ぜ	よ い	進ぜよ (shinzeyo, give!/may one give) 進ぜい (shinzei)
進ぜる (shinzeru, give)	進ぜ~~る~~	進ぜ	ろ よ い	進ぜろ (shinzero, give!/may one give) 進ぜよ (shinzeyo) 進ぜい (shinzei)
出る (deru, exit)	出~~る~~	出	ろ よ い	出ろ (dero, exit!/may one exits) 出よ (deyo) 出い (dei)
Irregular ichidan verbs
呉れる (kureru, give)	呉れ~~る~~	呉れ	(ろ)	呉れ(ろ) (kure(ro), give!/may one give)
御呉れる (okureru, give)	御呉れ~~る~~	御呉れ	(ろ)	御呉れ(ろ) (okure(ro), give!/may one give)
Irregular verbs
する (suru, do)	す~~る~~	し	ろ	しろ (shiro, do!/may one do)
する (suru, do)	す~~る~~	せ	よ い	せよ (seyo, do!/may one do) せい (sei)
勉強する (benkyō suru, study)	勉強す~~る~~	勉強し	ろ	勉強しろ (benkyō shiro, study!/may one study)
勉強する (benkyō suru, study)	勉強す~~る~~	勉強せ	よ い	勉強せよ (benkyō seyo, study!/may one study) 勉強せい (benkyō sei)
愛する (suru, love)	愛す~~る~~	愛せ		愛せ (aise, love!/may one love)
愛する (suru, love)	愛す~~る~~	愛し	ろ	愛しろ (aishiro, love!/may one love)
愛する (suru, love)	愛す~~る~~	愛せ	よ い	愛せよ (aiseyo, love!/may one love) 愛せい (aisei)
達する (tassuru, reach)	達す~~る~~	達せ		達せ (tasse, reach!/may one reach)
達する (tassuru, reach)	達す~~る~~	達し	ろ よ い	達しろ (tasshiro, reach!/may one reach) 達しよ (tasshiyo) 達しい (tasshii)
達する (tassuru, reach)	達す~~る~~	達せ	よ い	達せよ (tasseyo, reach!/may one reach) 達せい (tassei)
察する (sassuru, guess)	察す~~る~~	察し	ろ よ い	察しろ (sasshiro, guess!/may one guess) 察しよ (sasshiyo) 察しい (sasshii)
察する (sassuru, guess)	察す~~る~~	察せ	よ い	察せよ (sasseyo, guess!/may one guess) 察せい (sassei)
信ずる (shinzuru, believe)	信ず~~る~~	信じ	ろ よ い	信じろ (shinjiro, believe!/may one believe) 信じよ (shinjiyo) 信じい (shinjii)
信ずる (shinzuru, believe)	信ず~~る~~	信ぜ	よ い	信ぜよ (shinzeyo, believe!/may one believe) 信ぜい (shinzei)
進ずる (shinzuru, give)	進ず~~る~~	進じ 進ぜ	ろ よ い	進じろ (shinjiro, give!/may one give) 進ぜろ (shinzero) 進ぜよ (shinzeyo) 進じよ (shinjiyo) 進ぜい (shinzei) 進じい (shinjii)
来る (kuru, come)	く~~る~~	こ	い よ う	来い (koi, come!/may one come) 来よ (koyo) 来う (kō)
Verbal auxiliaries
〜ます(る) (‑masu(ru))	ます~~(る)~~	ませ まし		〜ませ (‑mase) 〜まし (‑mashi)
Adjectives and adjectival auxiliaries
無い (nai, be nonexistent) 無かる (nakaru) 無くある (naku aru)	無かる	無かれ		無かれ・勿れ (nakare, don't!/may there not be)
無い (nai, be nonexistent) 無かる (nakaru) 無くある (naku aru)	無くある	無くあれ		無くあれ (naku are, don't!/may there not be)
良い (ii/yoi, be good) 良かる (yokaru) 良くある (yoku aru)	良かる	良かれ		良かれ (yokare, be good!/may one be good)
良い (ii/yoi, be good) 良かる (yokaru) 良くある (yoku aru)	良くある	良くあれ		良くあれ (yoku are, be good!/may one be good)

=== Imperative: Grammatical compatibility ===
When quoted, imperatives are followed by the quotative particles such as to(te) or tte, and then a word for saying, telling, asking, ordering, begging, wishing, hoping, praying, etc. The resulting clauses can be translated indiscriminately into English as direct speech ("she told me, 'Go!'", "he wished, "May you be well.") or indirect speech ("she told me to go", "he wished me well"). Typographically, the quotation marks 「」『』〝〟 can be used for "direct speech" in written stories, but the verb forms themselves are not any different whether "direct" or "indirect."

Quoted imperatives
English	Japanese	Function
‘Fly, you fools!’ he cried, and was gone.	“Nigero, bakamonodomo!” to, kare wa sakende, mienaku narimashita. (「逃げろ、ばか者ども！」と、かれは叫んで、見えなくなりました。)	quoted command
No, don’t ask me to come back to Biloxi. Don’t ask me to face the demons that have haunted me for six years. Don’t ask me to become personally involved in your life.	Tanomu, boku ni Birokushi ni modore to iwanai de kure. Kono rokunenkan, boku o kurushimetsuzuketa akuma to taiji shiro to iwanai de kure. Kimi no jinsei ni kakaware to iwanai de kure. (頼む、ぼくにビロクシに戻れと言わないでくれ。この六年間、ぼくを苦しめ続けた悪魔と対峙しろと言わないでくれ。きみの人生にかかわれと言わないでくれ。)	quoted command
it didn’t mean she intended to gushingly enquire how high when he said jump.	kare ga “tobe” to meijita toki, “dono takasa made tobimashō ka?” to momide o shinagara ōjiru buka dake de wa nai to yū koto o. (彼が“跳べ”と命じたとき、“どの高さまで跳びましょうか？”と揉み手をしながら応じる部下だけではないということを。)	quoted command
Sakurauchi had already ordered that anyone who resisted, except Kumematsu, be put to the sword.	Sakurauchi wa senkoku, Kumematsu igai wa, hamukaeba zansatsu seyo to meijite ita. (桜内は先刻、粂松以外は、刃向かえば斬殺せよと命じていた。)	quoted command
Orders to be on guard against night raids were common, but one to sleep early, as would be issued to children, was unusual. […] At all events, since Nobunaga’s order was to sleep early, everyone finished dinner and promptly went to sleep.	Yashū o keikai seyo to no meirei wa yoku deru ga, hayaku neyo nado to yū, kodomo ni chūi suru yō na meirei wa irei de atta. […] Tonikaku, hayaku neyo to no Nobunaga no meirei de atta kara, meshi o kuiowaru to sōsō ni dare shi mo ga neta. (夜襲を警戒せよとの命令はよく出るが、早く寝よなどという、子どもに注意するような命令は異例であった。 […] とにかく、早く寝よとの信長の命令であったから、飯を食い終わると早々に誰しもが寝た。)	quoted command
“[…] Tell the Demon King to come out quickly and face me in battle.”	“[…] Maō ni hayaku dete shōbu o sei to itte kure.” (『[…]魔王に早く出て勝負をせいと言つて吳れ。』)	quoted command
The allure of the taiga was already welling up all over his body from the depths of his soul; enticing and deceptive, his distant hometown which he had not heard of was beckoning him to quickly escape from his drab routine.	So shite ima ya mitsurin no yūwaku ga kokoro no okusoko kara kare no karadajū ni wakiagari, yūin shi, azamukiyoseru, shōsoku no fumei na, tōku hedatatta kokyō ga hayaku haiiro no nichijō kara nogarete koyo to kare o temaneita no de aru kara, (そして今や密林の誘惑が心の奧底から彼のからだ中に湧き上り、誘引し、欺き寄せる、消息の不明な、遠く隔つた故鄕が早く灰色の日常から脫れて來よと彼を手招いたのであるから、)	quoted command
He curses me, then he tells Woo to look if there are sacks with seed in the barn.	danna wa washi ni akutarete, naya ni tane no fukuro ga aru ka nē ka mite kō to Ū ni iimashita. (旦那はわしに悪たれて、納屋に種子の袋があるかねえか見て来うとウーに言いました。)	quoted command
“[…] If I’d been told on the phone to come back, I would’ve been flying home……!” […] If her mother forgot, her father should’ve at least said, “Takaomi’s here, tell her to get back home.”	“[…] Denwa o kaketa toki ni de mo kaette koi tte iwarereba, watashi, tonde kaette kita no ni……!” […] Haha ga yū no o wasureta no nara, “Takaomi-kun ga kite iru kara kaette koi tte iinasai” to de mo chichi ga itte kuretara yokatta no da. (「[…]電話をかけたときにでも帰って来いって言われれば、わたし、飛んで帰ってきたのに……！」 […] 母が言うのを忘れたのなら、「隆臣君が来ているから帰って来いって言いなさい」とでも父が言ってくれたらよかったのだ。)	quoted command
So, a while ago, the steward called the huntsman Yermil and said, ‘Yermil, go to the post office.’	Sore de na, senkoro, oyashiki no bantō ga, inuban no Erumīru o yonde, ‘Erumīru, ekitei e itte kō’ tte itta n da. (それでな、先頃、お邸の番頭が、獵犬番のエルミールを呼んで、『エルミール、驛遞へ行つて來う。』つて言つたんだ。)	quoted command
“……Go to the Archbishop? You’re telling me to stab the Archbishop to death?” “You get stabbed to death!”	“……Daishukyō no tokoro ni itte? Atashi ni Daishukyō o sashikorose tte yū no?” “Omae ga sashikorosarero” (「……大主教のところに行って？ あたしに大主教を刺し殺せっていうの？」 「おまえが刺し殺されろ」)	quoted command
She was told it was ladylike to be beautiful, so she dressed up.	Shukujo taru mono, utsukushiku are to iwarete kikazari. (淑女たるもの、美しくあれと言われて着飾り。)	quoted wish
It was a longstanding convention that women must be beautiful.	Onna yo, utsukushikare to no mukashi no hito no shikitari de atta. (女よ、美しかれとの昔の人のしきたりであつた。)	quoted wish
The Emperor is the Essence who prays that our land and people be at peace.	Tennō wa, kuni yasukare, tami yasukare to inoru gosonzai desu. (天皇は、国安かれ、民安かれと祈る御存在です。)	quoted wish
The only thing to do now is to pray, “O Mr Yamada’s soul, rest in peace.”	Ima wa tada, “Yamada-san no rei yo yasukare” to inoru nomi de aru. (今はただ、〝山田さんの霊よ安かれ〟と祈るのみである。)	quoted wish
It also means to wish your partner as well as you would wish yourself.	Mata, jibun o yokare to omou no to onaji ōkisa de aite o yokare to negau kokoro de aru. (また、自分を良かれと思うのと同じ大きさで相手を良かれと願う心である。)	quoted wish

== Conditional ==
There are a few ways to make conditional clauses in Japanese, of which the verbally or adjectivally derived ways (rather than merely attaching conditional particles such as to) are termed the provisional, the conditional, and historically, the hypothetical, all of which include the particle ‑ba, with the conditional more commonly omitting ‑ba. These distinctive terms are proposed by Martin (2004:552–566), although other sources may confuse them in one way or another. Japanese terms include kateikei (仮定形; lit. 'hypothetical form') for the modern provisional, izenkei (已然形; lit. 'realized form') for the historical provisional, and mizenkei (未然形; lit. 'unrealized form') for the historical hypothetical, all of which do not include the particle ‑ba. However, some historical hypotheticals (mizenkei), such as nara(ba) and ‑tara(ba), have assumed the roles of modern provisionals (kateikei).

The provisional ends in ‑eba and expresses a prerequisite condition as in "provided that P happens, A naturally follows"; and a consequential condition as in "whenever P happens, A naturally follows." The conditional ends in ‑tara(ba)/‑dara(ba) (Note: In form, the mizenkei ‑tara/‑dara of the past endings ‑ta/‑da.) and expresses a contingent condition as in "if perchance P happens/happened, A has an opportunity to happen"; a temporal condition as in "when P happens/happened, A happens/happened;" and a consequential condition. Historically, the provisional could also express a past temporal condition ("when P happened"), and a causal condition ("because P happens/happened") which is now expressed with the particle kara. While the ‑eba provisional used to have a past temporal meaning ("when"), currently only the ‑tara(ba)/‑dara(ba) conditional can express any temporal meaning, past or future. However, the interpretation of a future ‑tara(ba)/‑dara(ba) condition can be either contingent ("if") or temporal ("when"), depending on the speaker's own conviction of the condition's likelihood: Kon'ya shujin ga kaette kitara, tazunemashō. (今夜主人が帰ってきたら、訊ねましょう。; 'If/when my husband comes home tonight, I'll ask.').

Both the provisional and conditional can be translated into English as "if", but the meanings are often different (although in some cases they can be very similar). The provisional apodosis ("then clause") naturally follows its protasis ("if clause"), and is expected or even desired to follow; while the conditional apodosis can be incidental to its protasis, or possibly be desired not to follow. This discrepancy is why the provisional is often used in advice on what to do, while the conditional in warnings on what not to do. Compare:

- "If you study twenty hours a day, you('ll) go crazy."
  - Provisional: Ichinichi ni nijū jikan benkyō sureba ki ga hen ni narimasu yo. (一日に二十時間勉強すれば気が変になりますよ。; It's natural that if you study twenty hours a day, you go crazy. → You ought to study twenty hours a day so you can go crazy)
  - Conditional: Ichinichi ni nijū jikan benkyō shitara ki ga hen ni narimasu yo. (一日に二十時間勉強したら気が変になりますよ。; You'd better not study twenty hours a day lest you go crazy.)
- "If you drop it, it breaks / it'll break."
  - Provisional: Otoseba kowaremasu yo. (落とせば壊れますよ; It's natural that if you drop it, it breaks. → You ought to drop it so you can break it.)
  - Conditional: Otoshitara kowaremasu yo. (落としたら壊れますよ; You'd better not drop it lest you break it.)

In the above examples, the outcomes of the apodoses, namely "going crazy" and "breaking it," are ordinarily undesirable, and thus ordinarily incompatible with the provisional; but it is not implausible for them to be desirable in inordinary contexts, such as in response to someone who intends to go crazy or break it. The desire for the provisional apodosis to obtain may still hold even if neither the provisional nor the conditional reads as a warning:

- "If you don't ask your teacher, you won't know the answer."
  - Provisional: Sensei ni kikanakereba wakarimasen yo. (先生に聞かなければ分かりませんよ; It's natural that if you ask your teacher, you'll know the answer. → You ought to ask your teacher so you know the answer.)
  - Conditional: Sensei ni kikanakattara wakarimasen yo. (先生に聞かなかったら分かりませんよ; Once you ask your teacher, you'll know the answer.)

The desirability of the provisional apodosis sets its apart from an apodosis made with the particle to, which similarly expresses matter-of-fact conditions, only without an insinuation of a desired apodosis:

- "If you press this button, you can buy commutation tickets."
  - Provisional: Kono botan o oseba, kaisūken ga kaemasu. (このボタンを押せば、回数券が買えます。; How can you buy commutation tickets? By pressing this button.)
  - With to: Kono botan o osu to, kaisūken ga kaemasu. (このボタンを押すと、回数券が買えます。; Here's how this ticket machine works: if you press this button, it's possible to buy commutation tickets.)

The conditional also allows room for doubt, or even counterfactuality, as in "if P had happened, A would have happened", and therefore is often followed by tentative statements in the past tense: Sono hon o yondara wakatta 'rō (その本を読んだら分かったろう; transl. If I had read this book, I would have understood). Without tentativity, the conditional would rather mean "when P happened, A happened": Sono hon o yondara wakatta (その本を読んだら分かった; transl. When I read this book, I understood). The provisional can also be used for counterfactuality in the past tense: Shītoberuto o shite ireba, tasukatta. (シートベルトをしていれば、助かった。; transl. If he'd been wearing a seatbelt, he would've lived.).

Nara(ba) is historically the hypothetical of the copula nari, but now used as the provisional of de aru → da, which additionally has de areba. When split by particles (wa, mo, etc), the modern de wa areba (← de areba) is normally used instead of the historical ni wa araba (← naraba). The copular nara(ba), spelt なら(ば), is not to be confused with naraba (成らば; 'if possible'), also spelt in kana as ならば. Nara(ba) is used when the speaker has found evidence to suppose that the protasis likely obtains:

- Ā, sō. Ame ga futte iru nara, takushī de kaeru yo. (ああ、そう。雨が降っているなら、タクシーで帰るよ。; Is that so? If it's raining [as you say], I'll go back by taxi.)
- Ōki-san mo kite iru yō desu ne. Ōki-san ga kite iru nara, watashi wa kaerimasu. (大木さんも来ているようですね。大木さんが来ているなら、私は帰ります。; It looks like Ōki’s here too [given that his shoes are here]. If he's here [as I can see], I'll go home.)

Conditional form example sentences
English	Japanese	Function
If my son succeeds, he shall be a great figure whose like is rarely seen, but even if he fails, he shall not be accountable to the land.	Watashi no musuko ga shubi yoku ikeba, mare ni miru idai na jinbutsu to naru de arō shi, tatoe fushubi de atte mo, kuni ni taishite sekinin wa nai. (わたしの息子が首尾よく行けば、稀に見る偉大な人物となるであろうし、たとえ不首尾であっても、国土に対して責任はない。)	prerequisite condition ("provided that it happens / doesn't happen", "unless it happens")
If you practice, you'll get better.	Renshū sureba jōtatsu suru (練習すれば上達する)	prerequisite condition ("provided that it happens / doesn't happen", "unless it happens")
If you wanna laugh, go ahead and laugh.	Waraitakereba warae (笑いたければ笑え)	prerequisite condition ("provided that it happens / doesn't happen", "unless it happens")
If it rains, the sports festival will be postponed.	Uten naraba undōkai wa enki da (雨天ならば運動会は延期だ)	prerequisite condition ("provided that it happens / doesn't happen", "unless it happens")
I'd be delighted if this book proved helpful to those intending to join a caring profession.	Honsho ga kaigoshoku o kokorozasu hitobito no ichijo to naru naraba saiwai de aru (本書が介護職を志す人々の一助となるならば幸いである)	prerequisite condition ("provided that it happens / doesn't happen", "unless it happens")
If you give the money at all, give it all willingly.	Dōse kane o dasu nara kirei ni dase (どうせ金を出すならきれいに出せ)	prerequisite condition ("provided that it happens / doesn't happen", "unless it happens")
The nastier criticism is, the more readers lap it up.	Hihyō wa shinratsu de areba aru hodo dokusha uke suru (批評は辛辣であればあるほど読者受けする)	prerequisite condition ("provided that it happens / doesn't happen", "unless it happens")
Many a little makes a mickle. (Note: Whenever piled up, even dust becomes mountains.)	Chiri mo tsumoreba yama to naru (塵も積もれば山となる)	consequential condition ("whenever/every time it happens / doesn't happen")
2 times 2 is 4. (Note: Whenever you multiply 2 by 2, it becomes 4.)	Ni ni ni o kakereba yon ni naru (２に２を掛ければ４になる)	consequential condition ("whenever/every time it happens / doesn't happen")
Clicking on the linked items brings up relevant pages. (Note: Whenever you click on the linked items, relevant pages are displayed.)	Rinku kōmoku o kurikku sureba, kanren pēji ga hyōji sareru (リンク項目をクリックすれば、関連ページが表示される)	consequential condition ("whenever/every time it happens / doesn't happen")
There's safety in numbers. (Note: Whenever there are many people, it's reassuring.)	Ninzū ga ōkereba anshin da (人数が多ければ安心だ)	consequential condition ("whenever/every time it happens / doesn't happen")
If you happen to see him, tell him to come and see me.	Moshi kare ni attara kuru yō ni itte kudasai (もし彼に会ったら来るように言ってください)	contingent condition ("if perchance it happens/had happened / doesn't/hadn't happen")
If I say it's white, it's white.	Ore ga shiro da to ittara shiro na n da (俺が白だと言ったら白なんだ)	contingent condition ("if perchance it happens/had happened / doesn't/hadn't happen")
She's the type that would risk her life for love. (Note: She's the type that would risk her life once she falls in love.)	Ano onna wa omoikondara inochigake no taipu da (あの女は思い込んだら命懸けのタイプだ)	contingent condition ("if perchance it happens/had happened / doesn't/hadn't happen")
From now on, too, I don’t want to regret things, thinking that I should have done things differently that time.	Kore kara mo, ano toki ā sureba yokatta to kōkai suru koto wa shitaku nai. (これからも、あのときああすればよかったと後悔することはしたくない。)	counterfactual condition ("if it (had) happened / didn't/hadn't happened")
If it were me, I wouldn't do such thing.	Watashi dattara sonna koto wa shimasen ne (私だったらそんなことはしませんね)	counterfactual condition ("if it (had) happened / didn't/hadn't happened")
It'd be great if this child were a boy. (Note: Spoken by a parent who has a daughter. If the child's gender is not known yet, for example in the early stage of a pregnancy, this can be translated as "It'll be great if this child is a boy.")	Kono ko ga otoko dattara, ii no ni nā. (この子が男だったら、いいのになあ！)	counterfactual condition ("if it (had) happened / didn't/hadn't happened")
If it'd been him, he wouldn't've made such a blunder.	Kare nara sonna hema wa shinakatta darō (彼ならそんなへまはしなかっただろう)	counterfactual condition ("if it (had) happened / didn't/hadn't happened")
His death will turn his family adrift. (Note: If/When he dies, his family will get lost on the wayside.)	Kare ga shindara ikka wa rotō ni mayou darō (彼が死んだら一家は路頭に迷うだろう)	temporal condition ("when/at the time it happens/happened / doesn't/didn't happen")
I'll be going as soon as I'm done with this, so wait a little bit, okay?	Kono shigoto o agetara iku kara chotto matte 'te (この仕事を上げたら行くからちょっと待ってて)	temporal condition ("when/at the time it happens/happened / doesn't/didn't happen")
The door opened when pushed.	Oshitara doa ga aita (押したらドアが開いた)	temporal condition ("when/at the time it happens/happened / doesn't/didn't happen")
Once you’ve bought the Editor book, it comes with a bonus section called “An Inside Look into Character Encoding.”	Edita no hon o kattaraba, “Moji Kōdo Urabanashi” to yū yomimono ga omake de tsuite kita. (エディタの本を買ったらば、「文字コード裏話」という読み物がオマケでついてきた。)	temporal condition ("when/at the time it happens/happened / doesn't/didn't happen")
If I told you the truth that when we die, we’re always reborn in the Land of Absolute Bliss, would you believe it?	Tatoeba watashitachi ga shindaraba kanarazu ōjō shimasu to yū shinjitsu o ohanashi shite mo minasan wa shinjiraremasu ka? (例えば私たちが死んだらば必ず往生しますという真実をお話ししても皆さんは信じられますか？)	temporal condition ("when/at the time it happens/happened / doesn't/didn't happen")

=== Conditional: Conjugation table ===
The conditional form is created by using the kateikei base, followed by a conditional particle, usually the hypothetical/provisional ba (ば), and occasionally with the elevated concessive do (mo) (ど(も)).

The ‑eba ending can be colloquially reduced to ‑ya(a), where the consonant b is weakened to the point of complete omission, as in ieba → *iewa → iya(a) (言えば; 'provided that one says'), ikeba → *ikewa → ikya(a) (行けば; 'provided that one goes'), mireba → *mirewa → mirya(a) (見れば; 'provided that one looks'), etc. In cases like mateba → *matewa → matya(a) (待てば; 'provided that one waits'), hanaseba → *hanasewa → hanasya(a) (話せば; 'provided that one speaks'), etc, the consonants ty and sy may be used rather than ch and sh. The adjectival ending ‑kereba → ‑kerya(a) in particular can be further reduced to ‑kya(a), as in akakereba → *akakerewa → akakerya(a) → akakya(a) (赤ければ; 'provided that one's red'). In western dialects where ‑n is used instead of ‑nai, there are ‑nkerya(a) and ‑nkya(a) (from ‑nkereba), and ‑nya(a) (from ‑neba). These colloquial reductions are analogous to how ‑te wa/‑de wa are reduced to ‑tya(a)/‑dya(a), ‑te aru/‑de aru/‑te yaru/‑de yaru to ‑ty(a)aru/‑dy(a)aru, de wa to dya(a) to ja(a), and de atte to dy(a)atte to j(a)atte, etc, although some of these reductions may be more dialectal than the others.

As is the case of the conclusives and attributives of nidan verbs, shinu and deku, their provisionals have been used in modern literature for literary flair before the 21st century, although currently their modern ichidan and godan counterparts are preferred.

The polite auxiliary ‑masu has two options, ‑masureba and ‑maseba. ‑Masureba has been said to be uncommon, while ‑maseba has been said to be nonstandard.

Dictionary form	Pattern			Conditional form	Fast-speech reduction
Godan and pseudo-yodan verbs
結う (yuu/yū, fasten)	結う	結え	ば	結えば (yueba, provided that one fastens)	結や(あ) (yuya(a))
言(い)う (yū, say)	ゆう	いえ	ば	言えば (ieba, provided that one says)	言や(あ) (iya(a))
勝つ (katsu, win)	勝つ	勝て	ば	勝てば (kateba, provided that one wins)	勝ちゃ(あ) (katya(a)/kacha(a))
狩る (karu, hunt)	狩る	狩れ	ば	狩れば (kareba, provided that one hunts)	狩りゃ(あ) (karya(a))
貸す (kasu, lend)	貸す	貸せ	ば	貸せば (kaseba, provided that one lends)	貸しゃ(あ) (kasya(a)/kasha(a))
愛す (aisu, love)	愛す	愛せ	ば	愛せば (aiseba, provided that one loves)	愛しゃ(あ) (aisya(a)/aisha(a))
達す (tassu, reach)	達す	達せ	ば	達せば (tasseba, provided that one reaches)	達しゃ(あ) (tassya(a)/tassha(a))
書く (kaku, write)	書く	書け	ば	書けば (kakeba, provided that one writes)	書きゃ(あ) (kakya(a))
嗅ぐ (kagu, smell)	嗅ぐ	嗅げ	ば	嗅げば (kageba, provided that one smells)	嗅ぎゃ(あ) (kagya(a))
呼ぶ (yobu, call)	呼ぶ	呼べ	ば	呼べば (yobeba, provided that one calls)	呼びゃ(あ) (yobya(a))
読む (yomu, read)	読む	読め	ば	読めば (yomeba, provided that one reads)	読みゃ(あ) (yomya(a))
死ぬ (shinu, die)	死ぬ	死ね	ば	死ねば (shineba, provided that one dies)	死にゃ(あ) (shinya(a))
Ichidan verbs
見る (miru, look)	見る	見れ	ば	見れば (mireba, provided that one looks)	見りゃ(あ) (mirya(a))
達しる (tasshiru, reach)	達しる	達しれ 達すれ	ば	達しれば (tasshireba, provided that one reaches) 達すれば (tassureba)	達しりゃ(あ) (tasshirya(a)) 達すりゃ(あ) (tassurya(a))
察しる (sasshiru, guess)	察しる	察しれ 察すれ	ば	察しれば (sasshireba, provided that one guesses) 察すれば (sassureba)	察しりゃ(あ) (sasshirya(a)) 察すりゃ(あ) (sassurya(a))
信じる (shinjiru, believe)	信じる	信じれ 信ずれ	ば	信じれば (shinjireba, provided that one believes) 信ずれば (shinzureba)	信じりゃ(あ) (shinjirya(a)) 信ずりゃ(あ) (shinzurya(a))
進じる (shinjiru, give)	進じる	進じれ 進ずれ	ば	進じれば (shinjireba, provided that one gives) 進ずれば (shinzureba)	進じりゃ(あ) (shinjirya(a)) 進ずりゃ(あ) (shinzurya(a))
進ぜる (shinzeru, give)	進ぜる	進ぜれ 進ずれ	ば	進ぜれば (shinzereba, provided that one gives) 進ずれば (shinzureba)	進ぜりゃ(あ) (shinzerya(a)) 進ずりゃ(あ) (shinzurya(a))
出来る (dekiru, come into existence / be possible)	出来る	出来れ	ば	出来れば (dekireba, provided that one comes into existence / is possible)	出来りゃ(あ) (dekirya(a))
生きる (ikiru, live)	生きる	生きれ	ば	生きれば (ikireba, provided that one lives)	生きりゃ(あ) (ikirya(a))
生ける (ikeru, enliven)	生ける	生けれ	ば	生ければ (ikereba, provided that one enlivens)	生けりゃ(あ) (ikerya(a))
出る (deru, exit)	出る	出れ	ば	出れば (dereba, provided that one exits)	出りゃ(あ) (derya(a))
受ける (ukeru, receive)	受ける	受けれ	ば	受ければ (ukereba, provided that one receives)	受けりゃ(あ) (ukerya(a))
Pseudo-nidan verbs
生く (iku, live / enliven) 生くる (ikuru)	生くる	生くれ	ば	生くれば (ikureba, provided that one lives / enlivens)	生くりゃ(あ) (ikurya(a))
出 (zu, exit) 出る (zuru)	出る	出れ	ば	出れば (zureba, provided that one exits)	出りゃ(あ) (zurya(a))
受く (uku, receive) 受くる (ukuru)	受くる	受くれ	ば	受くれば (ukureba, provided that one receives)	受くりゃ(あ) (ukurya(a))
Irregular verbs
する (suru, do)	する	すれ	ば	すれば (sureba, provided that one does)	すりゃ(あ) (surya(a))
勉強する (benkyō suru, study)	勉強する	勉強すれ	ば	勉強すれば (benkyō sureba, provided that one studies)	勉強すりゃ(あ) (benkyō surya(a))
愛する (aisuru, love)	愛する	愛すれ 愛せ	ば	愛すれば (aisureba, provided that one loves) 愛せば (aiseba)	愛すりゃ(あ) (aisurya(a)) 愛しゃ(あ) (aisya(a)/aisha(a))
達する (tassuru, reach)	達する	達すれ 達せ 達しれ	ば	達すれば (tassureba, provided that one reaches) 達せば (tasseba) 達しれば (tasshireba)	達すりゃ(あ) (tassurya(a)) 達しゃ(あ) (tassya(a)/tassha(a)) 達しりゃ(あ) (tasshirya(a))
察する (sassuru, guess)	察する	察すれ 察しれ	ば	察すれば (sassureba, provided that one guesses) 察しれば (sasshireba)	察すりゃ(あ) (sassurya(a)) 察しりゃ(あ) (sasshirya(a))
信ずる (shinzuru, believe)	信ずる	信ずれ 信じれ	ば	信ずれば (shinzureba, provided that one believes) 信じれば (shinjireba)	信ずりゃ(あ) (shinzurya(a)) 信じりゃ(あ) (shinjirya(a))
進ずる (shinzuru, give)	進ずる	進ずれ 進ぜれ 進じれ	ば	進ずれば (shinzureba, provided that one gives) 進ぜれば (shinzereba) 進じれば (shinjireba)	進ずりゃ(あ) (shinzurya(a)) 進ぜりゃ(あ) (shinzerya(a)) 進じりゃ(あ) (shinjirya(a))
来る (kuru, come)	来る	来れ	ば	来れば (kureba, provided that one comes)	来りゃ(あ) (kurya(a))
出来 (deku, come into existence / be possible) 出来る (dekuru)	出来る	出来れ	ば	出来れば (dekureba, provided that one comes into existence / is possible)	出来りゃ(あ) (dekurya(a))
死ぬ (shinu, die) 死ぬる (shinuru)	死ぬる	死ぬれ	ば	死ぬれば (shinureba, provided that one dies)	死ぬりゃ(あ) (shinurya(a))
Verbal auxiliaries
〜(ら)れる (‑(ra)reru) (Note: See Japanese conjugation (mizenkei base) § Passive.)	(ら)れる	(ら)れれ	ば	〜(ら)れれば (‑(ra)rereba)	〜(ら)れりゃ(あ) (‑(ra)rerya(a))
〜(ら)る (‑(ra)ru) 〜(ら)るる (‑(ra)ruru)	(ら)るる	(ら)るれ	ば	〜(ら)るれば (‑(ra)rureba)	〜(ら)るりゃ(あ) (‑(ra)rurya(a))
〜(さ)せる (‑(sa)seru) (Note: See Japanese conjugation (mizenkei base) § Causative.)	(さ)せる	(さ)せれ	ば	〜(さ)せれば (‑(sa)sereba)	〜(さ)せりゃ(あ) (‑(sa)serya(a))
〜(さ)す (‑(sa)su)	(さ)す	(さ)せ	ば	〜(さ)せば (‑(sa)seba)	〜(さ)しゃ(あ) (‑(sa)sya(a)/‑(sa)sha(a))
〜(さ)す (‑(sa)su) 〜(さ)する (‑(sa)suru)	(さ)する	(さ)すれ	ば	〜(さ)すれば (‑(sa)sureba)	〜(さ)すりゃ(あ) (‑(sa)surya(a))
〜しめる (‑shimeru) (Note: See Japanese conjugation (mizenkei base) § Causative.)	しめる	しめれ	ば	〜しめれば (‑shimereba)	〜しめりゃ(あ) (‑shimerya(a))
〜しむ (‑shimu) 〜しむる (‑shimuru)	しむる	しむれ	ば	〜しむれば (‑shimureba)	〜しむりゃ(あ) (‑shimurya(a))
〜ます(る) (‑masu(ru))	ます(る)	ますれ ませ	ば	〜ますれば (‑masureba) 〜ませば (‑maseba)	〜ますりゃ(あ) (‑masurya(a)) 〜ましゃ(あ) (‑masya(a)/‑masha(a))
〜た (‑ta) 〜たる (‑taru) 〜だ (‑da) 〜だる (‑daru)	たる だる	たら だら	(ば)	〜たら(ば) (‑tara(ba)) 〜だら(ば) (‑dara(ba))	
Adjectives and adjectival auxiliaries
無い (nai, be nonexistent)	無い	無けれ	ば	無ければ (nakereba, provided that one is nonexistent)	無けりゃ(あ) (nakerya(a)) 無きゃ(あ) (nakya(a))
良い (ii/yoi, be good)	いい よい	よけれ	ば	良ければ (yokereba, provided that one is good)	良けりゃ(あ) (yokerya(a)) 良きゃ(あ) (yokya(a))
可し (beshi, ought/have to) 可き (beki) 可い (bei)	べし べき べい	べけれ	ば	可ければ (bekereba, provided that one ought/has to)	可けりゃ(あ) (bekerya(a)) 可きゃ(あ) (bekya(a))
まじ (maji, ought/have not to) まじき (majiki) まじい (majii)	まじき まじい	まじけれ	ば	まじければ (majikereba, provided that one ought/has not to)	まじけりゃ(あ) (majikerya(a)) まじきゃ(あ) (majikya(a))
Special auxiliaries
〜ん (‑n, not) 〜ぬ (‑nu)	ん ぬ	ね	ば	〜ねば (‑neba, if not)	〜にゃ(あ) (‑nya(a))
〜ず (‑zu, without) 〜ざる (‑zaru)	ず	ず	(ん)ば	〜ず(ん)ば (‑zu(n)ba, if not)	
〜ず (‑zu, without) 〜ざる (‑zaru)	ざる	ざれ	ば	〜ざれば (‑zareba, if not)	〜ざりゃ(あ) (‑zarya(a))

=== Conditional: Grammatical compatibility ===
The provisional can be followed by certain idiomatic apodoses that mean "it is good" or "it's not good" to express necessity or obligation ("should," "ought to," "need," "had better," "have to," "must"). The "it's not good" apodoses combine with negative protases, as in "if one doesn't do it, it's not good," and eastern and western forms can be mixed and matched arbitrarily:

- Fully eastern: ‑nakereba/‑nakerya(a)/‑nakya(a) naranai/ikenai/yukenai/dame da
- Fully western: ‑neba/‑nya(a) naran(u)/narimasen(u)/iken(u)/yuken(u)/ikemasen(u)/yukemasen(u)/dame ja/dame ya/dame desu
- Eastern protasis + western apodosis: ‑nakereba/‑nakerya(a)/‑nakya(a) naran(u)/narimasen(u)/iken(u)/yuken(u)/ikemasen(u)/yukemasen(u)/dame ja/dame ya/dame desu
- Western protasis + eastern apodosis: ‑neba/‑nya(a) naranai/ikenai/yukenai/dame da

Idiomatic provisional apodoses
Apodosis	English	Japanese
ii/yoi (良い; 'it's good')	What should we do then, I wonder. (Note: Then, I wonder what it is that if we do it, it will be good.)	De wa, dō sureba ii darō. (では、どうすればいいだろう。)
yoroshii (宜しい; 'it's good')	Who should I see about registering for this conference? (Note: Who is it that if I see them, it will be good, regarding the registration for this conference?)	Kono kaigi ni tōroku suru koto ni kanshite dare to aeba yoroshii deshō ka (この会議に登録することに関して誰と会えばよろしいでしょうか)
naranai (成らない; 'it won't succeed → it's not good') naran (成らん) naranu (成らぬ) narimasen (成りません) narimasenu (成りませぬ)	If you want to get into that university you'll have to persevere at your studies. (Note: If you want to get into that university, if you don't study hard with great perseverance, it's not good.)	Sono daigaku ni hairitai no de areba, konki yoku benkyō shinakereba naranai (その大学に入りたいのであれば、根気よく勉強しなければならない)
naranai (成らない; 'it won't succeed → it's not good') naran (成らん) naranu (成らぬ) narimasen (成りません) narimasenu (成りませぬ)	A woman living alone must be take great care. (Note: Whenever a woman living alone doesn't take great care, it's not good.)	Josei no hitorigurashi wa yohodo yōjin shinakereba naranai (女性の一人暮らしはよほど用心しなければならない)
naranai (成らない; 'it won't succeed → it's not good') naran (成らん) naranu (成らぬ) narimasen (成りません) narimasenu (成りませぬ)	Two hundred thousand bands of force must be linked to it, each in its proper place,	Kore ni nijūmanko kara no chō-enerugī shūhatai o renraku shinakereba naran. Ikko ikko ga tadashii basho ni setsuzoku sarenakereba naran. (これに二十万個からの超エネルギー周波帯を連絡しなければならん。一個一個が正しい場所に接続されなければならん。)
naranai (成らない; 'it won't succeed → it's not good') naran (成らん) naranu (成らぬ) narimasen (成りません) narimasenu (成りませぬ)	but once face to face with reality, then must the ideal flame that has fed on our noblest desires be content to throw faithful light on the less fragile, less tender beauty of the mighty mass that crushes these desires.	Ga ittan genjitsu to men to mukaiaeba, wareware no saikō no ganbō o abura to shite moete ita risō no honō wa, sonna ganbō o funsai suru idai na genjitsu no, jiko yori mo morokaranu, jiko yori mo yowakaranu sono bi ni taishite, jiko no ari no mama no hikari o tōzuru ni manzoku shinakya naranu. (が一旦現實と面と向ひ合へば、我々の最高の願望を油として燃えて居た理想の炎は、そんな願望を粉碎する偉大な現實の、自己よりも脆からぬ、自己よりも弱からぬその美に對して、自己の有の儘の光を投ずるに滿足しなきやならぬ。)
naranai (成らない; 'it won't succeed → it's not good') naran (成らん) naranu (成らぬ) narimasen (成りません) narimasenu (成りませぬ)	And one must distinguish lyricism—which relies on the order of things—from all genres of fantastique.	Sate mata, jojōteki na mono――jibutsu no chitsujo ni ikyo suru jojōteki na mono to, arayuru shurui no gensōteki na mono to o kubetsu seneba naranai. (さてまた、抒情的なもの――事物の秩序に依拠する抒情的なものと、あらゆる種類の幻想的なものとを区別せねばならない。)
naranai (成らない; 'it won't succeed → it's not good') naran (成らん) naranu (成らぬ) narimasen (成りません) narimasenu (成りませぬ)	But we cannot complete the tests without first doing some design and showing our intent through the code.	Da ga, sono tesuto o kanryō saseru tame ni wa, puroguramu o sekkei seneba naran darō shi, sono sekkei no ito o kōdo to shite shimesaneba naran hazu da. (だが、そのテストを完了させるためには、プログラムを設計せねばならんだろうし、その設計の意図をコードとして示さねばならんはずだ。)
naranai (成らない; 'it won't succeed → it's not good') naran (成らん) naranu (成らぬ) narimasen (成りません) narimasenu (成りませぬ)	You must refrain from unnecessarily prying. (Note: If you don't refrain from unnecessarily prying, it's not good.)	Muyō no sensaku wa tsutsushimaneba naranu (無用の穿鑿は慎まねばならぬ)
naranai (成らない; 'it won't succeed → it's not good') naran (成らん) naranu (成らぬ) narimasen (成りません) narimasenu (成りませぬ)	We’re artists, so we have to put on eye-catching outfits. (Note: If we don’t put on eye-catching outfits, it’s not good.)	Geinin ja, naryā hitome o hiku minari o senyā naran. (藝人ぢや、なりやア一目を惹く眼裝をせにやアならん。)
naranai (成らない; 'it won't succeed → it's not good') naran (成らん) naranu (成らぬ) narimasen (成りません) narimasenu (成りませぬ)	I knew it was probably a good thing that it was lost, but I knew too that I must write a novel. […] I was damned if I would write one because it was what I should do if we were to eat regularly. When I had to write it, then it would be the only thing to do and there would be no choice.	Sore ga ushinawareta koto wa, tabun yoi koto da to wa, wakatte ita ga, mata shōsetsu o kakaneba naranu to yū koto mo wakatte ita. […] Watashitachi ga kisoku tadashiku shokuji shiyō to suru nara, watashi wa shōsetsu o kakaneba naranai――sonna riyū de, shōsetsu o kaku nante mappira da. Watashi ga kakaneba naranu toki wa, sore shika dekinakute, hoka ni sentaku no yochi no nai toki na no da. (それが失われたことは、たぶん良いことだとは、わかっていたが、また小説を書かねばならぬということもわかっていた。[…]私たちが規則正しく食事しようとするなら、私は小説を書かねばならない――そんな理由で、小説を書くなんてまっぴらだ。私が書かねばならぬときは、それしかできなくて、他に選択の余地のないときなのだ。)
naranai (成らない; 'it won't succeed → it's not good') naran (成らん) naranu (成らぬ) narimasen (成りません) narimasenu (成りませぬ)	Therefore, he had to go out into the world, and until the priest and samana dwelling within his heart finally died, he had to lose himself to lust and power, to women and money, and become a merchant, a gambler, a drinker and a greedy man. Therefore, he still had to bear these ugly years, bear the disgust, bear the emptiness and meaninglessness of a drearily forlorn life,	Da kara koso, kare wa zokusei e dete ikaneba naranakatta no da. So shite kare no kokoro ni sukutte iru shisai to shamon ga shinde shimau made, kyōraku to kensei, onna to kane no tame ni jibun no honsuji o miushinai, shōnin to nari tobakusha to nari, sakenomi to nari yokubari to naraneba naranakatta no da. Da kara koso, kare wa nao mo kono shūaku na toshitsuki tae, ōto ni tae, kōryō to shita daraku shita seikatsu no kūkyo to muigi ni taeneba naranakatta no da. (だからこそ、彼は俗世へ出て行かねばならなかったのだ。そして彼の心に巣くっている司祭と沙門が死んでしまうまで、享楽と権勢、女と金のために自分の本筋を見失い、商人となり賭博者となり、酒飲みとなり欲ばりとならねばならなかったのだ。だからこそ、彼はなおもこの醜悪な年月に耐え、嘔吐に耐え、荒涼とした堕落した生活の空虚と無意義に耐えねばならなかったのだ。)
naranai (成らない; 'it won't succeed → it's not good') naran (成らん) naranu (成らぬ) narimasen (成りません) narimasenu (成りませぬ)	‘Believe me, I hated having to take the step I took.’ (Note: Truthfully, if I didn’t take the step I took, it wouldn’t’ve been good, and I am totally anguished by that.)	“Jissai nē, kō shita shochi o seneba narananda washi mo, mattaku tsurai omoi o shite orimasu” (「實際ねえ、こうした處置をせねばならなんだわしも、全く辛い思いをしております」)
naranai (成らない; 'it won't succeed → it's not good') naran (成らん) naranu (成らぬ) narimasen (成りません) narimasenu (成りませぬ)	But still, I can’t do without Holy Unction. (Note: “If I don’t receive Holy Unction, it won’t be good.” Mē is a "rural" and/or "macho" version of the negative hortative extender mai. See Japanese conjugation (imperfective form) § Grammatical compatibility. Naru mai/mē equates to naranai/naranē/nannē/naran(u) darō/jarō, and narimasu mai/mē to naranai/naranē/nannē/naran(u)/narimasen(u) deshō.)	Tokoro de Seiyurei wa, dō atte mo ukenya naru mē. (ところで聖油禮は、どうあつても受けにやなるめえ。)
ikenai/yukenai (行けない; 'it can't go → it's not good') iken/yuken (行けん) ikenu/yukenu (行けぬ) ikemasen/yukemasen (行けません) ikemasenu/yukemasenu (行けませぬ) ikarenai/yukarenai (行かれない) ikaren/yukaren (行かれん) ikarenu/yukarenu (行かれぬ) ikaremasen/yukaremasen (行かれません) ikaremasenu/yukaremasenu (行かれませぬ)	You have to study hard like your brother. (Note: If you don't study hard like your brother, it's not good.)	Niisan ni minatte benkyō shinakereba ikenai (兄さんに見習って勉強しなければいけない)
ikenai/yukenai (行けない; 'it can't go → it's not good') iken/yuken (行けん) ikenu/yukenu (行けぬ) ikemasen/yukemasen (行けません) ikemasenu/yukemasenu (行けませぬ) ikarenai/yukarenai (行かれない) ikaren/yukaren (行かれん) ikarenu/yukarenu (行かれぬ) ikaremasen/yukaremasen (行かれません) ikaremasenu/yukaremasenu (行かれませぬ)	Consequently, one would have to take a large detour by car just to go to a place only a short stone’s throw away. (Note: If one doesn't take a large detour, it's not good.)	Sore yue ni issun me to hana no tokoro e yuku ni mo, jidōsha nara kaette ōukai shinakereba yukenai koto ga aru. (それ故に一寸目と鼻のところへゆくにも、自動車なら却つて大迂回しなければゆけないことがある。)
ikenai/yukenai (行けない; 'it can't go → it's not good') iken/yuken (行けん) ikenu/yukenu (行けぬ) ikemasen/yukemasen (行けません) ikemasenu/yukemasenu (行けませぬ) ikarenai/yukarenai (行かれない) ikaren/yukaren (行かれん) ikarenu/yukarenu (行かれぬ) ikaremasen/yukaremasen (行かれません) ikaremasenu/yukaremasenu (行かれませぬ)	Why is it you must wear black and white to weddings? Why must everybody agree to play golf or sing karaoke together?	Naze kekkonshiki ni shiro to kuro no fukusō de shusseki seneba ikenai no ka Naze soroi mo sorotte minna gorufu to karaoke o yaraneba ikenai no ka (なぜ 結婚式に 白と黒の服装で 出席せねばいけないのか なぜ そろいもそろって みんな ゴルフとカラオケをやらねばいけないのか)
ikenai/yukenai (行けない; 'it can't go → it's not good') iken/yuken (行けん) ikenu/yukenu (行けぬ) ikemasen/yukemasen (行けません) ikemasenu/yukemasenu (行けませぬ) ikarenai/yukarenai (行かれない) ikaren/yukaren (行かれん) ikarenu/yukarenu (行かれぬ) ikaremasen/yukaremasen (行かれません) ikaremasenu/yukaremasenu (行かれませぬ)	When automobiles first came to Japan, Mr Katō said that we had to keep watch of them, these were the primary factor that gives rise to socialism. (Note: If we don't keep watch of automobiles, it's not good.)	Nihon ni hajimete jidōsha no kita toki, Katō san wa, kono jidōsha o chūi seneba iken, kore ga shakai shugi o shōrai suru ichiban no gen’in da, to itta. (日本に初めて自動車の來た時、加藤さんは、この自動車を注意せねばいけん、これが社會主義を招徠する一番の原因だ、といつた。)
ikenai/yukenai (行けない; 'it can't go → it's not good') iken/yuken (行けん) ikenu/yukenu (行けぬ) ikemasen/yukemasen (行けません) ikemasenu/yukemasenu (行けませぬ) ikarenai/yukarenai (行かれない) ikaren/yukaren (行かれん) ikarenu/yukarenu (行かれぬ) ikaremasen/yukaremasen (行かれません) ikaremasenu/yukaremasenu (行かれませぬ)	“We gotta share with the neighbors.” (Note: If we don’t share with the neighbors, it’s not good.)	“Otonari ni mo osusowake senya iken nē” (「お隣にもおすそ分けせにゃいけんねえ」)
ikenai/yukenai (行けない; 'it can't go → it's not good') iken/yuken (行けん) ikenu/yukenu (行けぬ) ikemasen/yukemasen (行けません) ikemasenu/yukemasenu (行けませぬ) ikarenai/yukarenai (行かれない) ikaren/yukaren (行かれん) ikarenu/yukarenu (行かれぬ) ikaremasen/yukaremasen (行かれません) ikaremasenu/yukaremasenu (行かれませぬ)	He must, however, to have his chance of success, be acutely besides calmly perceptive, a reader of features, audacious at the proper moment.	Ga, seikō no kikai o toraen ni wa, kare wa mata tada ni shizuka ni sono chikaku o ugokasu bakari de naku, sorezore tekitō na jiki ni oite zuibun to daitan ni, hito no yōsu o dokuha seneba ikenu no de aru. (が、成功の機械を捉へんには、彼はまた啻に冷靜にその智覺を働かすばかりでなく、それ〲適當な時機に於て隨分と大膽に、他人の容貌を讀破せねばいけぬのである。)
ikenai/yukenai (行けない; 'it can't go → it's not good') iken/yuken (行けん) ikenu/yukenu (行けぬ) ikemasen/yukemasen (行けません) ikemasenu/yukemasenu (行けませぬ) ikarenai/yukarenai (行かれない) ikaren/yukaren (行かれん) ikarenu/yukarenu (行かれぬ) ikaremasen/yukaremasen (行かれません) ikaremasenu/yukaremasenu (行かれませぬ)	He speaks with ease where others cannot but struggle,	Tanin ga kurushimaneba yukenu tokoro e, ii to itte iru no da. (他人が苦しまねばゆけぬところへ、易々といつてゐるのだ。)
ikenai/yukenai (行けない; 'it can't go → it's not good') iken/yuken (行けん) ikenu/yukenu (行けぬ) ikemasen/yukemasen (行けません) ikemasenu/yukemasenu (行けませぬ) ikarenai/yukarenai (行かれない) ikaren/yukaren (行かれん) ikarenu/yukarenu (行かれぬ) ikaremasen/yukaremasen (行かれません) ikaremasenu/yukaremasenu (行かれませぬ)	Relief for those missing out on what is dictated by law must be provided later. (Note: If you don't provide relief later, it's not good.)	Hōritsu de kimerareta koto kara abureta hito no kyūsai wa ato kara seneba ikemasen. (法律で決められたことからあぶれた人の救済は後からせねばいけません。)
ikenai/yukenai (行けない; 'it can't go → it's not good') iken/yuken (行けん) ikenu/yukenu (行けぬ) ikemasen/yukemasen (行けません) ikemasenu/yukemasenu (行けませぬ) ikarenai/yukarenai (行かれない) ikaren/yukaren (行かれん) ikarenu/yukarenu (行かれぬ) ikaremasen/yukaremasen (行かれません) ikaremasenu/yukaremasenu (行かれませぬ)	You must have a balanced diet. (Note: If you don't have a balanced diet, it's not good.)	Shokuji ga katayoranai yō ni shinakereba ikemasen (食事が偏らないようにしなければいけません)
ikenai/yukenai (行けない; 'it can't go → it's not good') iken/yuken (行けん) ikenu/yukenu (行けぬ) ikemasen/yukemasen (行けません) ikemasenu/yukemasenu (行けませぬ) ikarenai/yukarenai (行かれない) ikaren/yukaren (行かれん) ikarenu/yukarenu (行かれぬ) ikaremasen/yukaremasen (行かれません) ikaremasenu/yukaremasenu (行かれませぬ)	But in the Land of Paintings, you would have to be something already in a painting.	Da kedo, E no Kuni ni wa e no naka no mono de nakereba ikarenai deshō. (だけど、繪の國には繪の中のものでなければいかれないでせう。)
ikenai/yukenai (行けない; 'it can't go → it's not good') iken/yuken (行けん) ikenu/yukenu (行けぬ) ikemasen/yukemasen (行けません) ikemasenu/yukemasenu (行けませぬ) ikarenai/yukarenai (行かれない) ikaren/yukaren (行かれん) ikarenu/yukarenu (行かれぬ) ikaremasen/yukaremasen (行かれません) ikaremasenu/yukaremasenu (行かれませぬ)	The rickshawmen say that it takes a lot as they have to take a night trip from here and climb two miles up a mountain slope, and because of that it must be a two pullers’ job no matter what.	Shafu wa, kore kara yomichi o kakete niri no yamasaka o nobotte yukaneba naranu no da kara to gyōsan sō ni, dō shite mo nininbiki de nakereba yukarenai to yū. (車夫は、これから夜道をかけて二里の山坂を登つてゆかねばならぬのだからと仰山さうに、どうしても二人びきでなければゆかれないといふ。)
ikenai/yukenai (行けない; 'it can't go → it's not good') iken/yuken (行けん) ikenu/yukenu (行けぬ) ikemasen/yukemasen (行けません) ikemasenu/yukemasenu (行けませぬ) ikarenai/yukarenai (行かれない) ikaren/yukaren (行かれん) ikarenu/yukarenu (行かれぬ) ikaremasen/yukaremasen (行かれません) ikaremasenu/yukaremasenu (行かれませぬ)	“I am truly sorry to hear of your situation, so I will let you go without paying the fare for the train you took here, but you will have to pay from this point on. […]”	“Anata no jijō o kiku to makoto ni oki no doku desu kara, koko made notte kita kishachin wa sore de harawanakute mo yoi koto ni shite agemasu ga, kore kara saki wa mata kawanakereba ikaremasu mai. […]” (「貴方の事情を聞くと眞にお氣の毒ですから、ここまで乘つて來た汽車賃はそれで拂はなくてもよい事にしてあげますが、これから先は又買はなければいかれますまい。[…]」)
ikenai/yukenai (行けない; 'it can't go → it's not good') iken/yuken (行けん) ikenu/yukenu (行けぬ) ikemasen/yukemasen (行けません) ikemasenu/yukemasenu (行けませぬ) ikarenai/yukarenai (行かれない) ikaren/yukaren (行かれん) ikarenu/yukarenu (行かれぬ) ikaremasen/yukaremasen (行かれません) ikaremasenu/yukaremasenu (行かれませぬ)	The men who come to their bandit general’s place have to pass through the courtyard of his home.	Hizoku no taishō no tokoro ni kuru bukatachi wa, sono ie no nakaniwa o tōranakereba yukaremasen. (匪賊の大將のところにくる部下達は、その家の中庭を通らなければゆかれません。)
ikenai/yukenai (行けない; 'it can't go → it's not good') iken/yuken (行けん) ikenu/yukenu (行けぬ) ikemasen/yukemasen (行けません) ikemasenu/yukemasenu (行けませぬ) ikarenai/yukarenai (行かれない) ikaren/yukaren (行かれん) ikarenu/yukarenu (行かれぬ) ikaremasen/yukaremasen (行かれません) ikaremasenu/yukaremasenu (行かれませぬ)	The old woman was wicked, told him lies, that the Isle of Yu was a treacherous place, that he would have to walk for eight days from here through the mountains, then for nine more days through river pools.	obāsan wa taihen warui hito de, uso o oshiemashita, Yu no Shima nante taihen na tokoro desu, kore kara yama no naka o yōka aruite, sono tsugi ni kawa no fuchi o mata kokonoka arukaneba yukaremasen yo to oshiemashita, (お婆さんは大へんわるい人で、噓を敎へました、湯の島なんて大へんなところです、これから山の中を八日あるいて、その次に川のふちを又九日あるかねばゆかれませんよと敎へました、)
dame da (駄目だ; 'it's a worthless go eye → it's not good') dame ja (駄目じゃ) dame ya (駄目や) dame desu (駄目です)	He needs to gain some weight. (Note: If he doesn't get fatter, it's bad.)	Motto futoranakereba dame da (もっと太らなければだめだ)
dame da (駄目だ; 'it's a worthless go eye → it's not good') dame ja (駄目じゃ) dame ya (駄目や) dame desu (駄目です)	“We’ve got to get clear of The Minkies,” I told him. “Once we’re clear of The Minkies we’re all right.”	“Minkī-shō o ukai shinakerya dame da. Minkī-shō sae kawashite shimaeba mō daijōbu da” (「ミンキー礁を迂回しなけりゃだめだ。ミンキー礁さえかわしてしまえばもう大丈夫だ」)
dame da (駄目だ; 'it's a worthless go eye → it's not good') dame ja (駄目じゃ) dame ya (駄目や) dame desu (駄目です)	No such thing as “you must do it this way” in cooking. Be free with your ideas.	Ryōri ni “kō shinakya dame” nante nai. Jiyū ni hassō sureba ii. (料理に「こうしなきゃダメ」なんてない。 自由に発想すればいい。)
dame da (駄目だ; 'it's a worthless go eye → it's not good') dame ja (駄目じゃ) dame ya (駄目や) dame desu (駄目です)	Mr Salton is a very fine young man. You must be welcoming to him, Letitia. (Note: “You must be welcome to him, mustn’t you?”)	Misutā Sōruton te totte mo suteki na seinen nē Retishia ttara motto kare ni aiso yoku shinakerya dame ja nai (ミスター・ソールトンて とっても すてきな青年ねぇ もうっ レティシアったら もっと彼に愛想よくしなけりゃだめじゃない)
dame da (駄目だ; 'it's a worthless go eye → it's not good') dame ja (駄目じゃ) dame ya (駄目や) dame desu (駄目です)	‘Really, Katherine, you must control the children! […]’ (Note: “Don’t you have to supervise the children⁉” or “You must supervise the children, mustn’t you⁉”)	“Kyasarin, kodomotachi o chan to kantoku shinakya dame ja nai ka!” (「キャサリン、子供たちをちゃんと監督しなきゃだめじゃないか！ […]」)
dame da (駄目だ; 'it's a worthless go eye → it's not good') dame ja (駄目じゃ) dame ya (駄目や) dame desu (駄目です)	I had to overcome it even though it was tough,	tsurai keredo kokufuku seneba dame da, (辛いけれど克服せねばだめだ、)
dame da (駄目だ; 'it's a worthless go eye → it's not good') dame ja (駄目じゃ) dame ya (駄目や) dame desu (駄目です)	“You’ve got to knock before you come in, no? What if I’m in the middle of changing?”	“Hairu toki wa nokku seneba dame ja zo? Washi ga kigaechū dattara dō suru no ja” (「入るときはノックせねばダメじゃぞ？ ワシが着替え中だったらどうするのじゃ」)

=== Provisional vs hypothetical ===
In classical Japanese, there was a distinction between the provisional izenkei (已然形) base, which expresses a prerequisite condition ("provided that one is/does"), and the hypothetical mizenkei (未然形) base, which expresses a contingent condition ("if one happens to be/do"). Furthermore, when these constructions are used in perfect clauses, they express temporal conditions ("when/because one had been/done"). Modern Japanese replaced the classical hypothetical base with the classical perfect hypothetical (which is dubbed the conditional by Martin (2004:564–566)), although the classical hypothetical lingers on in cliched phrases. The only exception is nara(ba), which became provisional. In the following table, the examples are given for kaku (書く; 'write'), suru (する; 'do'), da/de aru (だ・である; 'be') and yoi (良い; 'be good').

The idiom tatoeba (例えば; lit. 'if one happens to make a simile', 'for example') was the hypothetical form of the nidan verb tatō (例ふ; 'to make a simile'). The phrase sayō nara (左様なら; 'farewell') came from an archaic hypothetical phrase that literally meant "if it happens to be like that".

	Classical			Modern			Gloss
		Without wa	With wa		Without wa	With wa	Gloss
Prerequisite condition	Imperfect provisional	kakeba	kaki wa sureba	Imperfect provisional	kakeba kaku nara(ba)	kaki wa sureba	"provided that one writes"
Prerequisite condition	Imperfect provisional	kakaneba kakazareba	kaki wa seneba kaki wa sezareba	Imperfect provisional	kakanakereba kakanai nara(ba)	kaki wa shinakereba	"provided that one doesn't write"
Prerequisite condition	Imperfect provisional	sureba	shi wa sureba	Imperfect provisional	sureba suru nara(ba)	shi wa sureba	"provided that one does"
Prerequisite condition	Imperfect provisional	seneba sezareba	shi wa seneba shi wa sezareba	Imperfect provisional	shinakereba shinai nara(ba)	shi wa shinakereba	"provided that one doesn't do"
Prerequisite condition	Imperfect provisional	nareba	ni wa areba	Imperfect provisional	de areba (de aru) nara(ba)	de wa areba	"provided that one is"
Prerequisite condition	Imperfect provisional	naraneba narazareba	ni wa araneba ni wa arazareba	Imperfect provisional	de nakereba de nai nara(ba)	de wa nakereba	"provided that one isn't"
Prerequisite condition	Imperfect provisional	yokereba	yoku wa areba	Imperfect provisional	yokereba yoi nara(ba)	yoku wa areba	"provided that one is good"
Prerequisite condition	Imperfect provisional	yokarazareba	yoku wa arazareba	Imperfect provisional	yoku nakereba yoku nai nara(ba)	yoku wa nakereba	"provided that one isn't good"
Contingent condition Imperfect temporal condition	Imperfect hypothetical	kakaba	kaki wa seba	Perfect hypothetical	kaitara(ba) kaita nara(ba)	kaki wa shitara(ba)	"if one happens to write" "when one writes"
Contingent condition Imperfect temporal condition	Imperfect hypothetical	kakazu(n)ba	kaki wa sezu(n)ba	Perfect hypothetical	kakanakattara(ba) kakanakatta nara(ba)	kaki wa shinakattara(ba)	"if one doesn't happen to write" "when one doesn't write"
Contingent condition Imperfect temporal condition	Imperfect hypothetical	seba	shi wa seba	Perfect hypothetical	shitara(ba) shita nara(ba)	shi wa shitara(ba)	"if one happens to do" "when one does"
Contingent condition Imperfect temporal condition	Imperfect hypothetical	sezu(n)ba	shi wa sezu(n)ba	Perfect hypothetical	shinakattara(ba) shinakatta nara(ba)	shi wa shinakattara(ba)	"if one doesn't happen to do" "when one doesn't do"
Contingent condition Imperfect temporal condition	Imperfect hypothetical	naraba	ni wa araba	Perfect hypothetical	de attara(ba) → dattara(ba) de atta nara(ba) → datta nara(ba)	de wa attara(ba)	"if one happens to be" "when one is"
Contingent condition Imperfect temporal condition	Imperfect hypothetical	narazu(n)ba	ni wa arazu(n)ba	Perfect hypothetical	de nakattara(ba) de nakatta nara(ba)	de wa nakattara(ba)	"if one doesn't happen to be" "when one isn't"
Contingent condition Imperfect temporal condition	Imperfect hypothetical	yokuba	yoku wa araba	Perfect hypothetical	yokattara(ba) yokatta nara(ba)	yoku wa attara(ba)	"if one happens to be good" "when one is good"
Contingent condition Imperfect temporal condition	Imperfect hypothetical	yokarazu(n)ba	yoku wa arazu(n)ba	Perfect hypothetical	yoku nakattara(ba) yoku nakatta nara(ba)	yoku wa nakattara(ba)	"if one doesn't happen to be good" "when one isn't good"
Perfect temporal condition	Perfect hypothetical	kakitaraba	kaki wa shitaraba	Perfect hypothetical	kaitara(ba) kaita nara(ba)	kaki wa shitara(ba)	"when one wrote"
Perfect temporal condition	Perfect hypothetical	kakazaritaraba	kaki wa sezaritaraba	Perfect hypothetical	kakanakattara(ba) kakanakatta nara(ba)	kaki wa shinakattara(ba)	"when one didn't write"
Perfect temporal condition	Perfect hypothetical	shitaraba	shi wa shitaraba	Perfect hypothetical	shitara(ba) shita nara(ba)	shi wa shitara(ba)	"when one did"
Perfect temporal condition	Perfect hypothetical	sezaritaraba	shi wa sezaritaraba	Perfect hypothetical	shinakattara(ba) shinakatta nara(ba)	shi wa shinakattara(ba)	"when one didn't do"
Perfect temporal condition	Perfect hypothetical	naritaraba	ni wa aritaraba	Perfect hypothetical	de attara(ba) → dattara(ba) de atta nara(ba) → datta nara(ba)	de wa attara(ba)	"when one was"
Perfect temporal condition	Perfect hypothetical	narazaritaraba	ni wa arazaritaraba	Perfect hypothetical	de nakattara(ba) de nakatta nara(ba)	de wa nakattara(ba)	"when one wasn't"
Perfect temporal condition	Perfect hypothetical	yokaritaraba	yoku wa aritaraba	Perfect hypothetical	yokattara(ba) yokatta nara(ba)	yoku wa attara(ba)	"when one was good"
Perfect temporal condition	Perfect hypothetical	yokarazaritaraba	yoku wa arazaritaraba	Perfect hypothetical	yoku nakattara(ba) yoku nakatta nara(ba)	yoku wa nakattara(ba)	"when one wasn't good"
Perfect temporal condition	Perfect provisional	kakitareba	kaki wa shitareba				"when one wrote"
Perfect temporal condition	Perfect provisional	kakazaritareba	kaki wa sezaritareba				"when one didn't write"
Perfect temporal condition	Perfect provisional	shitareba	shi wa shitareba				"when one did"
Perfect temporal condition	Perfect provisional	sezaritareba	shi wa sezaritareba				"when one didn't do"
Perfect temporal condition	Perfect provisional	naritareba	ni wa aritareba				"when one was"
Perfect temporal condition	Perfect provisional	narazaritareba	ni wa arazaritareba				"when one wasn't"
Perfect temporal condition	Perfect provisional	yokaritareba	yoku wa aritareba				"when one was good"
Perfect temporal condition	Perfect provisional	yokazaritareba	yoku wa arazaritareba				"when one wasn't good"

=== Concessive ===
In earlier stages of Japanese, the particle -do (ど) was used in place of -ba (ば) for what is known as the concessive, which was used in premodern Edo Japanese. In the modern paradigm, combinations of the gerund and the particle mo (も), or of the infinitive and the particle nagara (ながら), are preferred, while the older concessive is used only in cliches or elevated writing.

== Politeness stylization ==
The auxiliaries desu and ‑masu, and the verb gozaru can be used to enhance politeness. In general, the more verbose forms with ‑masu and even gozaimasu are more polite.

- Desu substitutes de aru and da for more politeness. Desu adds politeness and expresses tense and affirmativity. It is common to attach desu to adjectives as in akai desu, but not to verbs as in kaku desu, the latter of which is less preferable than kakimasu:
  - de aru / da → desu ("are")
- Desu makes verbs and adjectives more polite. Desu only adds politeness:
  - akai → akai desu ("are red"), akaku nai → akaku nai desu ("aren't red")
  - akakatta → akakatta desu ("were red"), akaku nakatta → akaku nakatta desu ("weren't red")
  - kaku → kaku desu ("write"), kakanai → kakanai desu ("don't write")
  - kaita → kaita desu ("wrote"), kakanakatta → kakanakatta desu ("didn't write")
  - nai → nai desu ("don't exist")
  - nakatta → nakatta desu ("didn't exist")
  - de nai → de nai desu ("aren't")
  - de nakatta → de nakatta desu ("weren't")
- Deshita substitutes de atta and datta for more politeness. Deshita adds politeness and expresses tense and affirmativity:
  - de atta / datta → deshita ("were")
- Deshita makes past adjectives more polite. Deshita adds politeness and expresses tense and affirmativity:
  - akakatta → akai deshita ("were red")
- ‑Masu makes nonpast affirmative verbs more polite. ‑Masu adds politeness and expresses tense and affirmativity:
  - kaku → kakimasu ("write")
  - aru → arimasu ("exist")
  - de aru / da → de arimasu ("are")
- ‑Masen makes nonpast negative verbs more polite. ‑Masen adds politeness and expresses tense and negativity:
  - kakanai → kakimasen ("don't write")
  - nai → arimasen ("don't exist")
  - de nai → de arimasen ("aren't")
- ‑Masen deshita makes past negative verbs more polite. ‑Masen adds politeness and expresses negativity, while deshita maintains politeness and expresses tense:
  - akaku nakatta → akaku arimasen deshita ("weren't red")
  - kakanakatta → kakimasen deshita ("didn't write")
  - nakatta → arimasen deshita ("didn't exist")
  - de nakatta → de arimasen deshita ("weren't")
- Adjectives cannot directly combine with ‑masen, but with arimasen: (Note: In some cases, there may be ambiguity. Compare yoku nai desu (よくないです; 'aren't good') and yoku arimasen (よくありません; 'aren't common; aren't good (?)').)
  - akaku nai → akaku arimasen ("aren't red")
  - akaku nakatta → akaku arimasen deshita ("weren't red")
- ‑Mashita makes past affirmative verbs more polite. ‑Mashita adds politeness and expresses tense and affirmativity:
  - kaita → kakimashita ("wrote")
  - atta → arimashita ("existed")
  - de atta / datta → de arimashita ("were")
- Desu can further attach to ‑masu, ‑masen, ‑mashita for even more politeness, but such attachments have been characterized as, "excessively polite", "unrefined" or "ingratiating". Unlike deshita and deshō, desu does not add meaning, only politeness, which makes it problematic in these cases:
  - kakimasu → kakimasu desu ("write"), kakimasen → kakimasen desu ("don't write"), kakimashita → kakimashita desu ("wrote")
- Deshō makes nonpast affirmative tentative verbs, and past and nonpast tentative adjectives, more polite. The main verbs/adjectives express tense and affirmativity or negativity, while deshō adds politeness and expresses tentativity:
  - akai de arō / akai darō / akakarō → akai deshō ("are probably red")
  - akakatta de arō / akakatta darō / akakattarō → akakatta deshō ("were probably red")
  - akaku nai de arō / akaku nai darō / akaku nakarō → akaku nai/arimasen deshō ("aren't probably red")
  - akaku nakatta de arō / akaku nakatta darō / akaku nakattarō → akaku nakatta deshō ("weren't probably red")
  - kaku de arō / kaku darō / kakō → kakimasu/kaku deshō ("probably write")
  - kaita de arō / kaita darō / kaitarō → kakimashita/kaita deshō ("probably wrote")
  - kakanai de arō / kakanai darō / kakanakarō → kakimasen/kakanai deshō ("probably don't write")
  - kakanakatta de arō / kakanakatta darō / kakanakattarō → kakanakatta deshō ("probably didn't write")
  - aru de arō / aru darō / arō → arimasu/aru deshō ("probably exist")
  - atta de arō / atta darō / attarō → arimashita/atta deshō ("probably existed")
  - nai de arō / nai darō / nakarō → arimasen/nai deshō ("probably don't exist")
  - nakatta de arō / nakatta darō / nakattarō → nakatta deshō ("probably didn't existed")
  - de aru de arō / de aru darō / de arō / darō → deshō / de arimasu deshō ("probably are")
  - de atta de arō / de atta darō / de attarō / datta darō / dattarō → de arimashita/atta deshō ("probably were")
  - de nai de arō / de nai darō / de nakarō → de arimasen/nai deshō ("probably aren't")
  - de nakatta de arō / de nakatta darō / de nakattarō → de nakatta deshō ("probably weren't")
- ‑Masen deshita deshō makes past negative tentative verbs more polite. ‑Masen adds politeness and expresses negativity, deshita maintains politeness and expresses tense, while deshō maintains politeness and expresses tentativity:
  - akaku nakatta darō / akaku nakattarō → akaku arimasen deshita deshō ("probably weren't red")
  - kakanakatta darō / kakanakattarō → kakimasen deshita deshō ("probably didn't write")
  - nakatta darō / nakattarō → arimasen deshita deshō ("probably didn't exist")
  - de nakatta darō / de nakattarō → de arimasen deshita deshō ("probably weren't")
- Deshitarō can substitute deshita deshō, and ‑mashitarō can substitute ‑mashita deshō, although both are uncommon.
- ‑Mashō makes nonpast affirmative tentative/hortative verbs more polite. Whether the verb is tentative or hortative is contextual, but verbs with human agency tend to be hortative, and those without tend to be tentative. ‑Mashō adds politeness, and expresses tense, affirmativity and tentativity/hortativity:
  - kakō → kakimashō ("probably write; want to write; let's write")
  - kumorō → kumorimashō ("it's probably cloudy")
  - arō → arimashō ("probably exist")
  - de arō / darō → de arimashō ("probably are")
- Gozaimasu substitutes or appends to ‑masu, arimasu and desu for even more politeness. Extra instances of desu, deshita and deshō can be added to make up for missing forms. The negative and past forms can be based on the original verb/adjective, or based on gozaimasu, or supplied with deshita:
  - Nonpast affirmatives:
    - akai desu → akō gozaimasu ("are red"), akai deshō → akō gozaimashō ("are probably red")
    - kakimasu / kaku desu → kaku (no) de gozaimasu / kakimasu de gozaimasu ("write"), kakimasu/kaku deshō / kakimashō → kaku (no) de gozaimashō / kakimasu de gozaimashō ("probably write")
    - arimasu / aru desu → gozaimasu ("exist"), arimasu/aru deshō / arimashō → gozaimashō ("probably exist")
    - desu / de arimasu → de gozaimasu ("are"), deshō / de arimasu/aru deshō / de arimashō → de gozaimashō ("probably are")
  - Nonpast negatives based on gozaimasen:
    - akaku nai desu / akaku arimasen → akaku/akō gozaimasen ("aren't red"), akaku nai/arimasen deshō → akaku/akō gozaimasen deshō ("aren't probably red")
    - kakimasen / kakanai desu → kaku (no) de gozaimasen / kakimasu de gozaimasen ("don't write"), kakimasen/kakanai deshō → kaku (no) de gozaimasen deshō / kakimasu de gozaimasen deshō ("probably don't write")
    - arimasen / nai desu → gozaimasen ("don't exist"), arimasen/nai deshō → gozaimasen deshō ("probably don't exist")
    - de arimasen / de nai desu → de gozaimasen ("aren't"), de arimasen/nai deshō → de gozaimasen deshō ("probably are")
  - Nonpast negatives based on the main verbs:
    - kakimasen / kakanai desu → kakanai (no) de gozaimasu / kakimasen de gozaimasu ("don't write"), kakimasen/kakanai deshō → kakanai (no) de gozaimashō / kakimasen de gozaimashō ("probably don't write")
  - Past affirmatives based on gozaimashita:
    - akakatta desu / akai deshita → akō gozaimashita ("were red"), akakatta deshō → akō gozaimashita deshō ("were probably red")
    - kakimashita / kaita desu → kaku (no) de gozaimashita ("wrote"), kakimashita/kaita deshō → kaku (no) de gozaimashita deshō ("probably wrote")
    - arimashita / atta desu → gozaimashita ("existed"), arimashita/atta deshō → gozaimashita deshō ("probably existed")
    - deshita / de arimashita → de gozaimashita ("were"), deshita deshō / de arimashita/atta deshō → de gozaimashita deshō ("probably were")
  - Past affirmatives based on the main verbs/adjectives:
    - akakatta desu / akai deshita → akakatta de gozaimasu ("were red"), akakatta deshō → akakatta de gozaimashō ("were probably red")
    - kakimashita / kaita desu → kaita (no) de gozaimasu ("wrote"), kakimashita/kaita deshō → kaita (no) de gozaimashō ("probably wrote")
  - Past negatives based on gozaimasen deshita:
    - akaku nakatta desu / akaku arimasen deshita → akaku/akō gozaimasen deshita ("weren't red"), akaku nakatta/arimasen deshō → akaku/akō gozaimasen deshita deshō ("were probably red")
    - kakimasen deshita / kakanakatta desu → kaku (no) de gozaimasen deshita ("didn't write"), kakimasen deshita deshō / kakanakatta deshō → kaku (no) de gozaimasen deshita deshō ("probably didn't write")
    - arimasen deshita / nakatta desu → gozaimasen deshita ("didn't exist"), arimasen deshita deshō / nakatta deshō → gozaimasen deshita deshō ("probably didn't exist")
    - de arimasen deshita / de nakatta desu → de gozaimasen deshita ("weren't"), de arimasen deshita deshō / de nakatta deshō → de gozaimasen deshita deshō ("probably weren't")
  - Past negatives based on the main verbs/adjectives:
    - akaku nakatta desu / akaku arimasen deshita → akaku nakatta de gozaimasu ("weren't red"), akaku nakatta/arimasen deshō → akaku nakatta de gozaimashō ("were probably red")
    - kakimasen deshita / kakanakatta desu → kakanakatta (no) de gozaimasu ("didn't write"), kakimasen deshita deshō / kakanakatta deshō → kakanakatta (no) de gozaimashō ("probably didn't write")
- Gozaimasu deshō can substitute gozaimashō.

In principle, desu, de arimasu and de gozaimasu can be mere politeness enhancers and can attach to anything, even in such cases as ‑masu desu, ‑mashita desu, ‑masu de gozaimasu or (de) gozaimasu de gozaimasu.

== See also ==
- Honorific speech in Japanese
- Japanese grammar

== Bibliography ==
- Akimoto, Morihide (1 March 2001). Yamaguchi, Akiho; Akimoto, Morihide (eds.). 日本語文法大辞典 (in Japanese). Chiyoda, Tokyo: Meiji Shoin. pp. 709–710, 712–714, 742–743, 822–823, 871. ISBN 4-625-40300-6.
- Banno, Eri; Ikeda, Yōko; Ohno, Yutaka; Shinagawa, Chikako; Tokashiki, Kyōko (5 March 2020a) [20 May 1999]. GENKI: An Integrated Course in Elementary Japanese Ⅰ (3rd ed.). Chiyoda, Tokyo: The Japan Times Publishing. ISBN 978-4-7890-1730-5.
- Banno, Eri; Ikeda, Yōko; Ohno, Yutaka; Shinagawa, Chikako; Tokashiki, Kyōko (5 October 2020b) [20 October 1999]. GENKI: An Integrated Course in Elementary Japanese Ⅱ (3rd ed.). Chiyoda, Tokyo: The Japan Times Publishing. ISBN 978-4-7890-1732-9.
- Frellesvig, Bjarke (2010). A History of the Japanese Language. New York: Cambridge University Press. ISBN 978-0-521-65320-6.
- Fujii, Toshihiro (1 March 2001). Yamaguchi, Akiho; Akimoto, Morihide (eds.). 日本語文法大辞典 (in Japanese). Chiyoda, Tokyo: Meiji Shoin. pp. 38–39, 58–59, 100–101. ISBN 4-625-40300-6.
- Henderson, Harold Gould (1948) [1943]. Handbook of Japanese Grammar (revised ed.). Cambridge, Massachusetts: The Riverside Press.
- Iori, Isao; Takanashi, Shino; Nakanishi, Kumiko; Yamada, Toshihiro (15 November 2018). Matsuoka, Hiroshi (ed.). 初(しょ)級(きゅう)を教(おし)える人(ひと)のための日(に)本(ほん)文(ぶん)法(ぽう)ハンドブック (in Japanese). Chiyoda, Tokyo: 3A Corporation.
- Itoi, Michihiro (1 March 2001). Yamaguchi, Akiho; Akimoto, Morihide (eds.). 日本語文法大辞典 (in Japanese). Chiyoda, Tokyo: Meiji Shoin. pp. 614–617, 821–822. ISBN 4-625-40300-6.
- Kaiser, Stefan; Ichikawa, Yasuko; Kobayashi, Noriko; Yamamoto, Hilofumi (2013) [2001]. Japanese: A Comprehensive Grammar. Routledge Comprehensive Grammars (2nd ed.). Milton Park, Abingdon, Oxfordshire, Oxford; New York: Routledge. ISBN 978-0-203-08519-6.
- Kimura, Masanori (1 March 2001). しる （知る）. In Yamaguchi, Akiho; Akimoto, Morihide (eds.). 日本語文法大辞典 (in Japanese). Chiyoda, Tokyo: Meiji Shoin. pp. 353–354. ISBN 4-625-40300-6.
- Komatsu, Kōzō (1 March 2001). Yamaguchi, Akiho; Akimoto, Morihide (eds.). 日本語文法大辞典 (in Japanese). Chiyoda, Tokyo: Meiji Shoin. pp. 67–68, 161–162. ISBN 4-625-40300-6.
- Kubota, Atsushi (1 March 2001). Yamaguchi, Akiho; Akimoto, Morihide (eds.). 日本語文法大辞典 (in Japanese). Chiyoda, Tokyo: Meiji Shoin. pp. 32–33, 747. ISBN 4-625-40300-6.
- Koyanagi, Tomokazu (March 2014). 中央語における動詞活用の歴史 (PDF). 全国方言文法辞典資料集 (in Japanese). 2. 方言文法研究会: 20–29. NCID: BB1529267X. Archived (PDF) from the original on 20 October 2018.
- Kuno, Susumu (1973). The Structure of the Japanese Language. Cambridge, Massachusetts; London, England: MIT Press. ISBN 0-262-11049-0.
- Kuno, Susumu (1 April 1983). 新日本文法研究 (in Japanese). Chiyoda, Tokyo: Taishukan Publishing.
- Lammers, Wayne P. (2005). Japanese the Manga Way: An Illustrated Guide to Grammar and Structure (in English and Japanese). Berkeley, California: Stone Bridge Press. ISBN 978-1-880656-90-7.
- Makino, Seiichi; Tsutsui, Michio (20 May 2018) [20 March 1986]. A Dictionary of Basic Japanese Grammar 日本語基本文法辞典 (77th ed.). Minato, Tokyo: The Japan Times. ISBN 978-4-7890-0454-1.
- Martin, Samuel Elmo (2004) [1975]. A Reference Grammar of Japanese (revised ed.). Honolulu: University of Hawai'i Press. ISBN 0-8248-2818-6.
- Matsuoka McClain, Yoko (1986) [1981]. Handbook of Modern Japanese Grammar: including Lists of Words and Expressions with English Equivalents for Reading Aid 口語日本文法便覧（日本語特殊表現とその英語相当訳及び例題付）. Chiyoda, Tokyo: The Hokuseido Press. ISBN 4-590-00570-0.
- Ministry of Education, Science, Sports and Culture (15 September 1935a). 口語法別記 (in Japanese) (3rd ed.). Kyōbashi, Tokyo: Dainippon Tosho.
- Miura, Akira (2011). Essential Japanese Vocabulary: Learn to Avoid Common (and Embarrassing!) Mistakes. Tuttle Publishing. ISBN 978-4-8053-1127-1.
- Miyake, Toshihiro (1 April 2016). 可能動詞の成立. 日本語の研究 (in Japanese). 12 (2): 1–17. doi:10.20666/nihongonokenkyu.12.2_1. Archived from the original on 20 November 2017.
- Nakamura, Masayuki (31 March 2009). 日本語動詞の音便について (PDF). Kotonoha (in Japanese) (76). Japan: 古代文字資料館: 1–3. Archived (PDF) from the original on 19 August 2019.
- Nakano, Kotoyo (September 2008). "Japanese potential verb" 日本語の可能動詞 (PDF). 下関市立大学論集 (in Japanese). 52 (1–2). 下関市立大学学会: 103–114. ISSN 0387-5296. OCLC 183202722. SC20052000109. Archived (PDF) from the original on 26 January 2021.
- Shibuya, Katsumi (March 2002). Ōnishi, Takuichirō (ed.). 方言文法調査ガイドブック (PDF) (in Japanese). Kita, Tokyo: National Institute for Japanese Language and Linguistics.
- Poser, William John (23 November 1984). The Phonetics and Phonology of Tone and Intonation in Japanese (PDF) (doctoral thesis). Massachusetts Institute of Technology.
- Rubin, Jay (January 2004) [January 2002]. Making Sense of Japanese: What the Textbooks Don’t Tell You 日(に)本(ほん)語(ご)の秘(ひ)訣(けつ) (3rd ed.). Kodansha International. ISBN 4-7700-2802-4.
- Sakaki, Mika (17 January 2019). 動詞の音便の方言学的研究―サ行イ音便を中心として― (doctoral thesis) (in Japanese). Tohoku University. Archived from the original on 28 June 2021.
- Shirane, Haruo (2005). Classical Japanese: A Grammar. New York: Columbia University Press. ISBN 978-0-231-13524-5.
- Suzuki, Hideo (1 March 2001). Yamaguchi, Akiho; Akimoto, Morihide (eds.). 日本語文法大辞典 (in Japanese). Chiyoda, Tokyo: Meiji Shoin. pp. 336, 359–360, 598–599, 745–747, 843–844. ISBN 4-625-40300-6.
- Yada, Tsutomu (1 March 2001). Yamaguchi, Akiho; Akimoto, Morihide (eds.). 日本語文法大辞典 (in Japanese). Chiyoda, Tokyo: Meiji Shoin. pp. 209–210, 216. ISBN 4-625-40300-6.
- Yamaguchi, Akiho (1 March 2001). Yamaguchi, Akiho; Akimoto, Morihide (eds.). 日本語文法大辞典 (in Japanese). Chiyoda, Tokyo: Meiji Shoin. pp. 63–64, 162–163, 424–425, 502, 508–509, 728, 777, 822, 853. ISBN 4-625-40300-6.
- Yamauchi, Keisuke (1 March 2001). なさる（為さる）. In Yamaguchi, Akiho; Akimoto, Morihide (eds.). 日本語文法大辞典 (in Japanese). Chiyoda, Tokyo: Meiji Shoin. pp. 557–558. ISBN 4-625-40300-6.
