= Japanese phonology =

Phonological system of the Japanese language

Japanese phonology is the system of sounds used in the pronunciation of the Japanese language. Unless otherwise noted, this article describes the standard variety of Japanese based on the Tokyo dialect.

There is no overall consensus on the number of contrastive individual sounds (phonemes). Common approaches recognize at least 12 distinct consonants (as many as 21 in some analyses) and 5 distinct vowels, /a, e, i, o, u/. Phonetic length is contrastive for both vowels and consonants, and the total length of Japanese words can be measured in a unit of timing called the mora (from Latin mora "delay"). Only limited types of consonant clusters are permitted. Japanese speech also has a pitch accent system in which the position or absence of a pitch drop may determine the meaning of a word: /hásiɡa/ (箸が, 'chopsticks'), /hasíɡa/ (橋が, 'bridge'), /hasiɡa/ (端が, 'edge').

Japanese phonology has been affected by the presence of several layers of vocabulary in the language. In addition to native Japanese vocabulary, Japanese has a large amount of Chinese-based vocabulary (used especially to form technical and learned words, playing a similar role to Latin-based vocabulary in English) and loanwords from other languages. Different layers of vocabulary allow different possible sound sequences (phonotactics).

== Lexical strata ==
Many generalizations about the sound system of Japanese have exceptions when recent loanwords are taken into account. For example, the consonant [p] generally does not occur at the start of native (Yamato) or Chinese-derived (Sino-Japanese) words, but it occurs freely in this position in mimetic and foreign words. Because of exceptions like this, discussions of Japanese phonology often refer to layers, or "strata," of vocabulary. The following four strata may be distinguished:

=== Yamato ===
Called wago (和語) or yamato kotoba (大和言葉) in Japanese, this category consists of inherited native vocabulary. Morphemes in this category show a number of restrictions on structure that may be violated by vocabulary in other layers.

=== Mimetic ===
Japanese possesses a variety of mimetic words that make use of sound symbolism to serve an expressive function. Like Yamato vocabulary, these words are also of native origin, and can be considered to belong to the same overarching group. However, words of this type show some phonological peculiarities that cause some theorists to regard them as a separate layer of Japanese vocabulary.

=== Sino-Japanese ===
Called kango (漢語) in Japanese, (Note: The term jiongo (字音語) is sometimes used as a synonym (Shin Meikai kokugo jiten, etc.).) words in this stratum originate from several waves of large-scale borrowing from Chinese that occurred from the 6th-14th centuries AD. They comprise 60% of dictionary entries and 20% of ordinary spoken Japanese, ranging from formal vocabulary to everyday words. Most Sino-Japanese words are composed of more than one Sino-Japanese morpheme. Sino-Japanese morphemes have a limited phonological shape: each has a length of at most two moras, which Itō & Mester (2015a) argue reflects a restriction in size to a single prosodic foot. These morphemes represent the Japanese phonetic adaptation of Middle Chinese monosyllabic morphemes, each generally represented in writing by a single Chinese character, taken into Japanese as kanji (漢字). Japanese writers also repurposed kanji to represent native vocabulary; as a result, there is a distinction between Sino-Japanese readings of kanji, called On'yomi, and native readings, called Kun'yomi.

The moraic nasal /N/ is relatively common in Sino-Japanese, and contact with Middle Chinese is often described as being responsible for the presence of /N/ in Japanese (starting from approximately 800 AD in Early Middle Japanese), although /N/ also came to exist in native Japanese words as a result of sound changes.

=== Foreign ===
Called gairaigo (外来語) in Japanese, this layer of vocabulary consists of non-Sino-Japanese words of foreign origin, mostly borrowed from Western languages after the 16th century; many of them entered the language in the 20th century. In words of this stratum, a number of consonant-vowel sequences that did not previously exist in Japanese are tolerated, which has led to the introduction of new spelling conventions and complicates the phonemic analysis of these consonant sounds in Japanese.

== Consonants ==
		Bilabial	Dental/ Alveolar		(Alveolo-) palatal		Velar	Uvular	Glottal	Special moras
		Bilabial	plain	sibilant	plain	sibilant	Velar	Uvular	Glottal	Special moras
Nasal		m	n		(ɲ)		(ŋ)	(ɴ)		/N/
Plosive/ Affricate	voiceless	p	t	(ts)		(tɕ)	k		(ʔ)	/Q/
Plosive/ Affricate	voiced	b	d	(dz)		(dʑ)	ɡ			/Q/
Fricative	voiceless	(ɸ)		s	(ç)	(ɕ)	(x) (Note: An allophone of /h/ that only occurs as a geminate.)	(χ) (Note: An allophone of /h/.)	h	/Q/
Fricative	voiced	(β) (Note: A dubious phoneme found only in foreignisms. Only a few innovative speakers make a contrast between /β~v/ and /b/.)		z		(ʑ)	(ɣ)		(ɦ) (Note: An allophone of /h/ that only occurs between vowels.)	/Q/
Sonorant		w	r		j					

Different linguists analyze the Japanese inventory of consonant phonemes in significantly different ways. Smith (1980) recognizes only 12 underlying consonants (/m p b n t d s dz r k ɡ h/), whereas Okada (1999) recognizes 16, equivalent to Smith's 12 plus the following 4 (/j w ts ɴ/), and Vance (2008) recognizes 21, equivalent to Smith's 12 plus the following 9 (/j w ts tɕ (d)ʑ ɕ ɸ N Q/). Consonants inside parentheses in the table can be analyzed as allophones of other phonemes, at least in native words. In loanwords, /ɸ, ts/ sometimes occur phonemically.

In some analyses, the glides/semivowels [j, w] are not interpreted as consonant phonemes. In non-loanword vocabulary, they generally occur only in the sequences [ja, jɯ, jo] and [wa], which are sometimes analyzed as rising diphthongs rather than as consonant-vowel sequences. Lawrence (2004) analyzes the glides as non-syllabic variants of the high vowel phonemes /i, u/, arguing that the use of [j, w] vs. [i, ɯ] may be predictable if both phonological and morphological context is taken into account.

=== Phonetic notes ===
==== Details of articulation ====
- [t, d, n] are variously described as lamino-alveolar ([t̻, d̻, n̻]), apico-alveolar ([t̺, d̺, n̺]) or apico-dental ([t̺̪, d̺̪, n̺̪]), or simply dental or denti-alveolar.
- [ts, s, dz~z] are lamino-alveolar [t̻s̻, s̻, d̻z̻~z̻].
- [tɕ, ɕ, dʑ~ʑ] are lamino(dorso)-alveolopalatal [t̠ɕ, ɕ, d̠ʑ~ʑ]. The affricates are sometimes transcribed broadly as [cɕ, ɟʑ] (standing for prepalatal [c̟ɕ, ɟ̟ʑ]). The palatalized allophone of /n/ before /i/ or /j/ is also lamino-alveolopalatal or prepalatal, and so can be transcribed as [ɲ̟], or more broadly as [ɲ]. Recasens (2013) reports its place of articulation as dentoalveolar or alveolar.
- The approximant /w/ is traditionally described as velar [ɰ], labial–velar [w], or as the semivocalic equivalent of /u/ with little to no rounding. However, a 2020 real-time MRI study found that it is likely better described as purely bilabial [β̞] as there is less velar constriction in the consonant /w/ than in the vowel /u/, (Note: Consonants have greater constriction than vowels by definition; if the velar constriction of /w/ is less than /u/, then the bilabial constriction must be its primary articulation.) and thus a transcription of [ɰ], [ɰʷ], or [w] would all be misleading.
- /h/ is [ç] before /i/ and /j/, and [ɸ] before /u/, coarticulated with the labial compression of that vowel. When not preceded by a pause, it often may be breathy-voiced [ɦ] rather than voiceless [h].
- Realization of the liquid phoneme /r/ varies greatly depending on environment and dialect. The prototypical and most common pronunciation is an apical tap, either alveolar [ɾ] or postalveolar [ɾ̠]. Utterance-initially and after /N/, the tap is typically articulated in such a way that the tip of the tongue is at first momentarily in light contact with the alveolar ridge before being released rapidly by airflow. This sound is described variably as a tap, a "variant of [ɾ]", "a kind of weak plosive", and "an affricate with short friction, [d̠ɹ̝̆]". The apical alveolar or postalveolar lateral approximant [l] is a common variant in all conditions, particularly utterance-initially and before /i, j/. According to Akamatsu (1997), utterance-initially and intervocalically (that is, except after /N/), the lateral variant is better described as a tap [ɺ] rather than an approximant. The retroflex lateral approximant [ɭ] is also found before /i, j/. In Tokyo's Shitamachi dialect, the alveolar trill [r] is a variant marked with vulgarity. Other reported variants include the alveolar approximant [ɹ], the alveolar stop [d], the retroflex flap [ɽ], the lateral fricative [ɮ], and the retroflex stop [ɖ].

==== Voice onset time ====
At the start of a word, the voiceless stops /p, t, k/ are slightly aspirated—less so than English stops, but more than those in Spanish. Word-medial /p, t, k/ seem to be unaspirated on average. Phonetic studies in the 1980s observed an effect of accent as well as word position, with longer voice onset time (greater aspiration) in accented syllables than in unaccented syllables.

A 2019 study of young adult speakers found that after a pause, word-initial /b, d, ɡ/ may be pronounced as plosives with zero or low positive voice onset time (categorizable as voiceless unaspirated or "short-lag" plosives); while significantly less aspirated on average than word-initial /p, t, k/, some overlap in voice onset time was observed. A secondary cue to the distinction between /b, d, ɡ/ and /p, t, k/ in word-initial position is a pitch offset on the following vowel: vowels after word-initial (but not word-medial) /p, t, k/ start out with a higher pitch compared to vowels after /b, d, ɡ/, even when the latter are phonetically devoiced. Word-medial /b, d, ɡ/ are normally fully voiced (or prevoiced), but may become non-plosives through lenition.

==== Lenition ====
The phonemes /b, d, ɡ/ have weakened non-plosive pronunciations that can be broadly transcribed as voiced fricatives [β, ð, ɣ], although they may be realized instead as voiced approximants [β̞, ð̞~ɹ, ɣ̞~ɰ]. There is no context where the non-plosive pronunciations are consistently used, but they occur most often between vowels:

/b/ > [β]	/aburu/ > [aβɯɾɯ]	あぶる, aburu, 'to warm, broil'
/d/ > [ð]	/tomodati/ > [tomoðat͡ɕi]	友達, tomodachi, 'friend'
/ɡ/ > [ɣ]	/egaku/ > [eɣakɯ]	描く, egaku, 'to picture'

These weakened pronunciations can occur after a vowel in the middle of a word, or when a word starting with /b, d, ɡ/ follows a vowel-final word with no intervening pause. Maekawa (2018) found that, as with the pronunciation of /z/ as [dz] vs. [z], the use of plosive vs. non-plosive realizations of /b, d, ɡ/ is closely correlated with the time available to a speaker to articulate the consonant, which is affected by speech rate as well as the identity of the preceding sound. All three show a high (over 90%) rate of plosive pronunciations after /Q/ or after a pause; after /N/, plosive pronunciations occur at high (over 80%) rates for /b/ and /d/, but less frequently for /ɡ/, probably because word-medial /ɡ/ after /N/ is often pronounced instead as a velar nasal [ŋ] (although the use of [ŋ] here may be declining for younger speakers). Across contexts, /d/ generally has a higher rate of plosive realizations than /b/ and /ɡ/.

=== Moraic consonants ===
Certain consonant sounds are called "moraic" because they count for a mora, a unit of timing or prosodic length. The phonemic analysis of moraic consonants is disputed. One approach, particularly popular among Japanese scholars, analyzes moraic consonants as the phonetic realization of special "mora phonemes" (モーラ音素, mōra onso): a mora nasal /N/, called the hatsuon, and a mora obstruent consonant /Q/, called the sokuon. The pronunciation of these sounds varies depending on context: because of this, they may be analyzed as "placeless" phonemes with no phonologically specified place of articulation. A competing approach rejects the transcriptions /Q/ and /N/ and the identification of moraic consonants as their own phonemes, treating them instead as the syllable-final realizations of other consonant phonemes (although some analysts prefer to avoid using the concept of syllables when discussing Japanese phonology).

==== Moraic nasal ====
The moraic nasal or mora nasal (hiragana ⟨ん⟩, katakana ⟨ン⟩, romanized as ⟨n⟩ or ⟨n'⟩) can be interpreted as a syllable-final nasal consonant. Aside from certain marginal exceptions, it is found only after a vowel, which is phonetically nasalized in this context. It can be followed by a consonant, a vowel, or the end of a word:

[ompa]	音波, onpa, 'sound wave'	(hiragana: おんぱ, three moras long)
[daɰ̃atsɯ]	弾圧, dan'atsu, 'oppression'	(hiragana: だんあつ, four moras long)
[saɴ]	三, san, 'three'	(hiragana: さん, two moras long)

Its pronunciation varies depending on the sound that follows it (including across a word boundary).

- Before a plosive, affricate, nasal, or liquid, it is pronounced as a nasal consonant assimilated to the place of the following consonant:

bilabial [m] before /p, b, m/	[sammai]	三枚, sanmai, 'three sheets'
velar [ŋ] before /k, ɡ/	[saŋkai]	三回, sankai, 'three times'
dorso-palatal [ŋʲ] before [kʲ, ɡʲ]	[ɡeŋʲkʲi]	元気, genki, 'healthy'
lamino-alveolar [n] before [t, d, ts, dz, n]	[sanneɴ]	三年, sannen, 'three years'
lamino-alveolopalatal [ɲ̟] before [tɕ, dʑ, ɲ̟]	[saɲ̟tɕoː]	三兆, sanchō, 'three trillion'
apico-alveolar [n̺] or postalveolar [n̠] before /r/	[san̺ɾɯi], [ɕin̠d̠ɹ̝̆i]	三塁, sanrui, 'third base', 真理, shinri, 'truth'

- Before a vowel, approximant /j, w/, or voiceless fricative [ɸ, s, ɕ, ç, h], it is a nasalized vowel or moraic semivowel that can be broadly transcribed as [ɰ̃] (its specific quality depends on the surrounding sounds). This pronunciation may also occur before the voiced fricatives [z, ʑ], although more often, they are pronounced as affricates when preceded by the moraic nasal.

At the end of an utterance, the moraic nasal is pronounced as a nasal segment with a variable place of articulation and variable degree of constriction. Its pronunciation in this position is traditionally described and transcribed as uvular [ɴ], sometimes with the qualification that it is, or approaches, velar [ŋ] after front vowels. Some descriptions state that it may have incomplete occlusion and can potentially be realized as a nasalized vowel, as in intervocalic position. Instrumental studies in the 2010s showed that there is considerable variability in its pronunciation and that it often involves a lip closure or constriction. A study of real-time MRI data collected between 2017 and 2019 found that the pronunciation of the moraic nasal in utterance-final position most often involves vocal tract closure with a tongue position that can range from uvular to alveolar: it is assimilated to the position of the preceding vowel (for example, uvular realizations were observed only after the back vowels /a, o/), but the range of overlap observed between similar vowel pairs suggests this assimilation is not a categorical allophonic rule, but a gradient phonetic process. 5% of the utterance-final samples of the moraic nasal were realized as nasalized vowels with no closure: in this case, appreciable tongue raising was observed only when the preceding vowel was /a/.

There are a variety of competing phonemic analyses of the moraic nasal. It may be transcribed with the non-IPA symbol /N/ and analyzed as a "placeless" nasal. Some analysts do not categorize it as a phonological consonant. (Note: Labrune (2012) considers /N/ to be a "special segment", neither a consonant nor a vowel, and analyzes it as a deficient prosodeme specified only for [+consonantal] and [+nasal]. Trigo Ferré (1988) analyzes it as a placeless non-consonantal nasal glide. Youngberg (2021a) analyzes Tokyo Japanese as possessing underlying long nasal vowels, e.g. /kẽːka/, and explains the nasal consonant in the surface phonetic form as a non-phonemic transition.) Alternatively, it may be analyzed as a uvular nasal /ɴ/, based on the traditional description of its pronunciation before a pause. It is sometimes analyzed as a syllable-final allophone of the coronal nasal consonant /n/, but this requires treating syllable or mora boundaries as potentially distinctive, because there is a clear contrast in pronunciation between the moraic nasal and non-moraic /n/ before a vowel or before /j/:

Moraic nasal		Non-moraic /n/
[kaɰ̃.a.ke]	寒明け, kan'ake, 'the end of the coldest season'	[ka.na.ke]	金気, kanake, 'metallic taste'
[kaɰ̃.juː]	勧誘, kan'yū, 'solicitation; inducement'	[ka.ɲuː]	加入, kanyū, 'becoming a member of a group'

Alternatively, in an analysis that treats syllabification as distinctive, the moraic nasal can be interpreted as an archiphoneme (a contextual neutralization of otherwise contrastive phonemes), since there is no contrast in syllable-final position between /m/ and /n/.

Thus, depending on the analysis, a word like 三枚, sanmai, 'three sheets', pronounced phonetically as [sammai], could be phonemically transcribed as /saNmai/, /saɴmai/, or /sanmai/.

==== Moraic obstruent ====
There is a contrast between short (or singleton) and long (or geminate) consonant sounds. Compared to singleton consonants, geminate consonants have greater phonetic duration (realized for plosives and affricates in the form of a longer hold phase before the release of the consonant, and for fricatives in the form of a longer period of frication). A geminate can be analyzed phonologically as a syllable-final consonant followed by a syllable-initial consonant (although the hypothesized syllable boundary is not evident at the phonetic level) and can be transcribed phonetically as two occurrences of the same consonant phone in sequence: a geminate plosive or affricate is pronounced with just one release, so the first portion of such a geminate may be transcribed as an unreleased stop. As discussed above, geminate nasal consonants are normally analyzed as sequences of a moraic nasal followed by a non-moraic nasal, e.g. [mm], [nn] = /Nm/, /Nn/. In the case of non-nasal consonants, gemination is mostly restricted by Japanese phonotactics to the voiceless obstruents /p t k s/ and their allophones. (However, other consonant phonemes can appear as geminates in special contexts, such as in loanwords.)

Geminate consonants can also be phonetically transcribed with a length mark, as in [ipːai], but this notation obscures mora boundaries. Vance (2008) uses the length marker to mark a moraic nasal, as [sɑ̃mːbɑi], based on the fact that a moraic consonant by itself has the same prosodic weight as a consonant-vowel sequence: consequently, Vance transcribes Japanese geminates with two length markers, e.g. [sɑ̃mːːɑi], [ipːːɑi], and refers to them as "extra-long" consonants, on the grounds that there is no acoustic boundary between two halves of a geminate. In the following transcriptions, geminates will be phonetically transcribed as two occurrences of the same consonant across a syllable boundary, the first being unreleased.

Singleton			Geminate
[aka]	垢, aka, 'dirt'	(あか, two moras long)	[ak̚ka]	悪化, akka, 'worsening'	(あっか, three moras long)
[isai]	異才, isai, 'genius'	(いさい, three moras long)	[issai]	一歳, issai, 'one year old'	(いっさい, four moras long)
[satɕi]	幸, sachi, 'good luck'	(さち, two moras long)	[sat̚tɕi]	察知, satchi, 'inference'	(さっち, three moras long)

A common phonemic analysis treats all geminate obstruents as sequences starting with the same consonant: a "mora obstruent", called the sokuon (促音) in Japanese, which can be phonemically transcribed with the non-IPA character /Q/. According to this analysis, [ak̚ka], [issai], [sat̚tɕi] are phonemically /aQka/, /iQsai/, /saQti/. This analysis seems to be supported by the intuition of native speakers and matches the use in kana spelling of a single symbol, a small version of the tsu sign (hiragana ⟨っ⟩, katakana ⟨ッ⟩) to write the first half of any geminate obstruent. Some analyses treat /Q/ as an underlyingly placeless consonant.

Another approach dispenses with /Q/ and treats geminate consonants as double consonant phonemes, that is, as sequences consisting of a consonant phoneme followed by itself. According to this analysis, [ak̚ka], [issai], [sat̚tɕi] are phonemically /akka/, /issai/, /satti/. Alternatively, since the contrast between different obstruent consonants such as /k/, /s/, /t/ is neutralized in syllable-final position, the first half of a geminate obstruent can be interpreted as an archiphoneme (just as the moraic nasal can be interpreted as an archiphoneme representing the neutralization of the contrast between the nasal consonants /m/, /n/ in syllable-final position).

It has been suggested that the underlying phonemic representation of the sokuon might be a glottal stop /ʔ/. The sound [ʔ] is used in certain marginal forms that can be interpreted as containing /Q/ not followed by another obstruent. For example, [ʔ] can be found at the end of an exclamation, or before a sonorant in forms with emphatic gemination, and ⟨っ⟩ is used as a written representation of [ʔ] in these contexts. This suggests that Japanese speakers identify [ʔ] as the default form of /Q/, or the form it takes when it is not possible for it to share its place and manner of articulation with a following obstruent. According to this analysis, [ak̚ka], [issai], [sat̚tɕi] are phonemically /aʔka/, /iʔsai/, /saʔti/.

Even if it can be phonemically analyzed as /ʔ/, the sokuon is not always phonetically glottal. A study by Fujimoto, Maekawa & Funatsu (2010) used a video recording system and observed no glottal constriction during the pronunciation of Japanese geminate consonants. These results stand in conflict with the impressionistic descriptions of some authors, such as Hattori (1984:139), who ascribes glottal tension to the first half of geminate consonants. An acoustic study by Idemaru & Guion (2008) reported some evidence of creaky voice being more frequent for vowels following geminate consonants in Japanese (although only one of three measures of creakiness showed a significant difference). Kawahara (2015:54) concludes that the role of glottal tension in Japanese geminates requires further research.

=== Voiced affricate vs. fricative ===
The distinction between the voiced fricatives [z, ʑ] (originally allophones of /z/) and the voiced affricates [dz, dʑ] (originally allophones of /d/) is neutralized in Standard Japanese and in most (although not all) regional Japanese dialects. (Some dialects, e.g. Tosa, retain the distinctions between /zi/ and /di/ and between /zu/ and /du/, while others distinguish only /zu/ and /du/ but not /zi/ and /di/. Yet others merge all four, e.g. north Tōhoku.)

In accents with the merger, the phonetically variable [(d)z] sound can be transcribed phonemically as /z/, though some analyze it as /dz/, the voiced counterpart to [ts]. A 2010 corpus study found that in neutralizing varieties, both the fricative and the affricate pronunciation could be found in any position in a word, but the likelihood of the affricate realization was increased in phonetic conditions that allowed for greater time to articulate the consonant: voiced affricates were found to occur on average 60% of the time after /N/, 74% after /Q/, and 80% after a pause. In addition, the rate of fricative realizations increased as speech rate increased. In terms of direction, these effects match those found for the use of plosive vs. non-plosive pronunciations of the voiced stops /b, d, ɡ/; however, the overall rate of fricative realizations of /(d)z/ (including both [dz~z] and [dʑ~ʑ], in either intervocalic or postnasal position) seems to be higher than the rate of non-plosive realizations of /b, d, ɡ/.

As a result of the neutralization, the historical spelling distinction between these sounds has been eliminated from the modern written standard except in cases where a mora is repeated once voiceless and once voiced, or where rendaku occurs in a compound word: つづく[続く] /tuzuku/, いちづける[位置付ける] /itizukeru/ from |iti+tukeru|. The use of the historical or morphological spelling in these contexts does not indicate a phonetic distinction: /zu/ and /zi/ in Standard Japanese are variably pronounced with affricates or fricatives according to the contextual tendencies described above, regardless of whether they are underlyingly voiced or derived by rendaku from /tu/ and /ti/.

=== Voiceless coronal affricate ===
In core vocabulary, [ts] can be analyzed as an allophone of /t/ before /u/:

/t/ > [ts]	/tuɡi/ > [tsɯɡi]	次, tsugi, 'next'

In loanwords, however, [ts] can occur before other vowels: examples include [tsaitoɡaisɯto] ツァイトガイスト, tsaitogaisuto, 'zeitgeist'; [eɾitsiɴ] エリツィン, Eritsin, 'Yeltsin'. There are also a small number of native forms with [ts] before a vowel other than /u/, such as オトッツァン, otottsan, 'dad', although these are marginal and nonstandard (the standard form of this word is お父さん, otōsan). Based on dialectal or colloquial forms like these, as well as the phonetic distance between plosive and affricate sounds, Hattori (1950) argues that the affricate [ts] is its own phoneme, represented by the non-IPA symbol /c/ (also interpreted to include [tɕ] before [i]). In contrast, Shibatani (1990) disregards such forms as exceptional, and prefers analyzing [ts] and [tɕ] as allophones of /t/, not as a distinct affricate phoneme.

=== Palatalized consonants ===
Most consonants possess phonetically palatalized counterparts. Pairs of palatalized and non-palatalized consonants contrast before the back vowels /a o u/, but are in complementary distribution before the front vowels: only the palatalized version occurs before /i/, and only the non-palatalized version occurs before /e/ (excluding certain marginal forms). Palatalized consonants are often analyzed as allophones conditioned by the presence of a following /i/ or /j/. When this analysis is adopted, a palatalized consonant before a back vowel is interpreted as a biphonemic /Cj/ sequence. The phonemic analysis described above can be applied straightforwardly to the palatalized counterparts of /p b k ɡ m n r/, as in the following examples:

/mi/ > [mʲi]	/umi/ > [ɯmʲi]	海, umi, 'sea'
/mj/ > [mʲ]	/mjaku/ > [mʲakɯ]	脈, myaku, 'pulse'
/ɡj/ > [ɡʲ]	/ɡjoːza/ > [ɡʲoːza]	ぎょうざ, gyōza, 'fried dumpling'
/ri/ > [ɾʲi]	/kiri/ > [kʲiɾʲi]	霧, kiri, 'fog'

The palatalized counterpart of /h/ is normally described as [ç] (although some speakers do not distinguish [ç] from [ɕ]):

/hi/ > [çi]	/hito/ > [çito]	人, hito, 'person'
/hj/ > [ç]	/hjaku/ > [çakɯ]	百, hyaku, 'hundred'

In the analysis presented above, a sequence like [mʲa] is interpreted as containing three phonemes, /mja/, with a complex onset cluster of the form /Cj/. Palatalized consonants could instead be interpreted as their own phonemes, in which case [mʲa] is composed of /mʲ/ + /a/. A third alternative is analyzing [ja, jo, jɯ]~[ʲa, ʲo, ʲɯ] as rising diphthongs (/i͜a i͜o i͜u/), in which case [mʲa] is composed of /m/ + /i͜a/. Nogita (2016) argues for the cluster analysis /Cj/, noting that in Japanese, syllables such as [bja, ɡja, mja, nja, ɾja] show a longer average duration than their non-palatalized counterparts [ba, ɡa, ma, na, ɾa] (whereas comparable duration differences were not generally found between pairs of palatalized and unpalatalized consonants in Russian).

The glides /j w/ cannot precede /j/. The alveolar-palatal sibilants [tɕ ɕ (d)ʑ] can be analyzed as the palatalized allophones of /t s z/, but it is debated whether this phonemic interpretation remains accurate in light of contrasts found in loanword phonology.

=== Alveolo-palatal sibilants ===
The three alveolo-palatal sibilants [tɕ ɕ (d)ʑ] function, at least historically, as the palatalized counterparts of the four coronal obstruents [t s d (d)z]. Original /ti/ came to be pronounced as [tɕi], original /si/ came to be pronounced as [ɕi], and original /di/ and /zi/ both came to be pronounced as [(d)ʑi]. (As a result, the sequences [ti si di (d)zi] do not occur in native or Sino-Japanese vocabulary.)

/s/ > [ɕ]	/sio/ > [ɕi.o]	塩, shio, 'salt'
/z/ > [dʑ~ʑ]	/mozi/ > [modʑi ~ moʑi]	文字, moji, 'letter, character'
/t/ > [tɕ]	/tiziN/ > [tɕidʑiɴ] ~ [tɕiʑiɴ]	知人, chijin, 'acquaintance'

Likewise, original /tj/ came to be pronounced as [tɕ], original /sj/ came to be pronounced as [ɕ], and original /dj/ and /zj/ both came to be pronounced as [(d)ʑ]:

/sj/ > [ɕ]	/isja/ > [iɕa]	医者, isha, 'medical doctor'
/zj/ > [dʑ~ʑ]	/ɡozjuː/ > [ɡodʑɯː ~ ɡoʑɯː]	五十, gojū, 'fifty'
/tj/ > [tɕ]	/tja/ > [tɕa]	茶, cha, 'tea'

Therefore, alveolo-palatal [tɕ dʑ ɕ ʑ] can be analyzed as positional allophones of /t d s z/ before /i/, or as the surface realization of underlying /tj dj sj zj/ clusters before other vowels. For example, [ɕi] can be analyzed as /si/ and [ɕa] as /sja/. Likewise, [tɕi] can be analyzed as /ti/ and /tɕa/ as /tja/. Most dialects show a merger in the pronunciation of underlying /d/ and /z/ before /j/ or /i/, with the resulting merged phone varying between [ʑ] and [dʑ]. The contrast between /d/ and /z/ is also neutralized before /u/ in most dialects (see above).

While the diachronic origins of these sounds as allophones of /t s d z/ is uncontroversial, there is disagreement among linguists about whether alveolo-palatal sibilants continue to function synchronically as allophones of coronal consonant phonemes: the identification of [tɕ] as a palatalized allophone of /t/ is especially debated, due to the presence of a distinctive contrast between [tɕi] and [ti] in the foreign stratum of Standard Japanese vocabulary.

==== [tɕi (d)ʑi] vs. foreign [ti, di] ====
The sequences [ti, di] are found exclusively in recent loanwords; they have been assigned the novel kana spellings ティ, ディ. (Loanwords borrowed before [ti] was widely tolerated usually replaced this sequence with チ [tɕi] or (more rarely) テ [te], and certain forms exhibiting these replacements continue to be used; likewise, ジ [(d)ʑi] or デ [de] can be found instead of [di] in some forms, such as ラジオ, rajio, 'radio' and デジタル, dejitaru, 'digital'.) Based on a study of type frequency in a lexicon and token frequency in a spoken corpus, Hall (2013) concludes that [t] and [tɕ] have become about as contrastive before /i/ as they are before /a/. Some analysts argue that the use of [ti, di] in loanwords shows that the change of /ti/ to [tɕi] is an inactive, 'fossilized' rule, and conclude that [tɕi] must now be analyzed as containing an affricate phoneme distinct from /t/; others argue that pronunciation of /ti/ as [tɕi] continues to be an active rule of Japanese phonology, but that this rule is restricted from applying to words belonging to the foreign stratum.

In contrast to [ti, di], the sequences *[si, zi] are not established even in loanwords. English /s/ is still normally adapted as [ɕ] before /i/ (i.e. with katakana シ, shi). An example is シネマ, shinema [ɕinema] from cinema. Likewise, English /z/ is normally adapted as [(d)ʑ] before /i/ (i.e. with katakana ジ, ji). Pronouncing loanwords with [si] or [zi] is rare even among the most innovative speakers, but not entirely absent. To transcribe [si], as opposed to [ɕi], it is possible to use the novel kana spelling スィ (su + small i) (though this has also been used to transcribe original [sw] before /i/ in forms like スィッチ, 'switch' [sɯittɕi], as an alternative to the spellings スイッチ, suitchi or スウィッチ, suwitchi). The use of スィ and its voiced counterpart ズィ was mentioned, but not officially recommended, by a 1991 cabinet directive on the use of kana to spell foreign words. Nogita (2016) argues that the difference between [ɕi] and [si] may be marginally contrastive for some speakers, whereas Labrune (2012) denies that *[si, zi] are ever distinguished in pronunciation from [ɕi, (d)ʑi] in adapted forms, regardless of whether the spellings スィ and ズィare used in writing.

The sequence [tsi] (as opposed to either [tɕi] or [ti]) also has some marginal use in loanwords. An example is エリツィン, Eritsin, 'Yeltsin'. In many cases a variant adaptation with [tɕi] exists.

==== Alternations involving [tɕ ɕ (d)ʑ] ====
Aside from arguments based on loanword phonology, there is also disagreement about the phonemic analysis of native Japanese forms. Some verbs can be analyzed as having an underlying stem that ends in either /t/ or /s/; these become [tɕ] or [ɕ] respectively before inflectional suffixes that start with [i]:

[matanai] 'wait' (negative)	vs.	[matɕimasu] 'wait' (polite)
[kasanai] 'lend' (negative)	vs.	[kaɕimasu] 'lend' (polite)

In addition, Shibatani (1990) notes that in casual speech, /se/ or /te/ in verb forms may undergo coalescence with a following /ba/ (marking the conditional), forming [ɕaː] and [tɕaː] respectively, as in [kaɕaː] for /kaseba/ 'if (I) lend' and [katɕaː] for /kateba/ 'if (I) win.' On the other hand, per Vance (1987), [tj, sj] (more narrowly, [tj̥, sj̥]) can occur instead of [tɕ, ɕ] for some speakers in contracted speech forms, such as [tjɯː] for /tojuː/ 'saying', [matja(ː)] for /mateba/ 'if one waits', and [hanasja(ː)] for /hanaseba/ 'if one speaks'; Vance notes these could be dismissed as non-phonemic rapid speech variants.

Hattori (1950) argues that alternations in verb forms do not prove [tɕ] is phonemically /t/, citing kawanai (with /w/) vs. kai, kau, kae, etc. as evidence that a stem-final consonant is not always maintained without phonemic change throughout a verb's conjugated forms, and /joɴdewa/~/joɴzja/ '(must not) read' as evidence that palatalization produced by vowel coalescence can result in alternation between different consonant phonemes.

==== Competing phonemic analyses ====
There are several alternatives to the interpretation of [tɕ ɕ (d)ʑ] as allophones of /t s z/ before /i/ or /j/.

Some interpretations agree with the analysis of [ɕ] as an allophone of /s/ and [(d)ʑ] as an allophone of /z/ (or /dz/), but treat [tɕ] as the palatalized allophone of a voiceless coronal affricate phoneme /ts/ (to clarify that it is analyzed as a single phoneme, some linguists phonemically transcribe this affricate as /tˢ/ or with the non-IPA symbol /c/). In this sort of analysis, [tɕi, tɕa] = /tsi, tsja/.

Other interpretations treat [tɕ ɕ (d)ʑ] as their own phonemes, while treating other palatalized consonants as allophones or clusters. The status of [tɕ ɕ (d)ʑ] as phonemes rather than clusters ending in /j/ is argued to be supported by the stable use of the sequences [tɕe (d)ʑe ɕe] in loanwords; in contrast, /je/ is somewhat unstable (it may be variably replaced with /ie/ or /e/), and other consonant + /je/ sequences such as [pje], [kje] are generally absent. (Aside from loanwords, [tɕe ɕe] also occur marginally in native vocabulary in certain exclamatory forms.)

It has alternatively been suggested that pairs like [tɕi] vs. [ti] could be analyzed as /tji/ vs. /ti/. Vance (2008) objects to analyses like /tji/ on the basis that the sequence /ji/ is otherwise forbidden in Japanese phonology.

=== Voiceless bilabial fricative ===
In core vocabulary, the voiceless bilabial fricative [ɸ] occurs only before /u/. In this context, [ɸ] can be analyzed as an allophone of /h/. Examples include [ɸɯne] (ふね, fune, 'boat') and [ɸɯ̥ta] (ふた, futa, 'lid'), which can be phonemically transcribed as /hune/, /huta/. Some descriptions of Japanese phonetics state that the initial sound of ふ, fu /hu/ is not consistently produced as [ɸ], but is sometimes a sound with weak or no bilabial friction that could be transcribed as [h] (a voiceless approximant similar to the start of English "who").

In loanwords, [ɸ] can occur before other vowels or before /j/. Examples include [ɸiɴ] (フィン, fin, 'fin'), [ɸeɾiː] (フェリー, ferī, 'ferry'), [ɸaɴ] (ファン, fan, 'fan'), [ɸoːmɯ] (フォーム, fōmu, 'form'), and [ɸjɯː(d)ʑoɴ] (フュージョン, fyūjon, 'fusion'). Because of loanwords like these, the consonant [ɸ] is distinguished from [h] before /a e o/, as in the minimal pair [ɸoːkɯ] (フォーク, fōku) and [hoːkɯ] (ホーク, hōku) from English fork and hawk; likewise, [ɸ] is distinguished from [ç] before /i/. Even in loanwords, [ɸ] is not distinguished from [h] before /u/: for example, English hood and food are both adopted as Japanese [ɸɯːdo] (フード, fūdo).

The integration of [ɸi], [ɸe], [ɸa], [ɸo] and [ɸjɯ] into contemporary spoken Standard Japanese seems to have been completed at some point after the middle of the twentieth century, in the post-war period: before then, these sequences of sounds seem to have been commonly used only in educated pronunciation. Loanwords borrowed more recently than around 1890 fairly consistently show [ɸ] as an adaptation of foreign [f]. Some older borrowed forms show adaptation of foreign [f] to Japanese /h/ before a vowel other than /u/, such as コーヒー, kōhī, 'coffee' and プラットホーム, purattohōmu, 'platform'. Another old adaptation pattern replaced foreign [f] with [ɸɯ] before a vowel other than /u/, e.g. film > [ɸɯ.i.rɯ.mɯ] フイルム, fuirumu. Both of these replacement strategies are largely obsolete nowadays, although certain old adapted forms continue to be used, sometimes with specialized meanings compared to a variant pronunciation: for example, フイルム, fuirumu tends to be restricted in modern use to photographic films, whereas フィルム, firumu is used for other senses of "film" such as movie films.

=== Voiced bilabial fricative ===
Spellings with the kana vu (ヴ) have been used in narrow transcriptions into Japanese, in an attempt to render a voiced labiodental fricative, [v], in other languages, which most Japanese speakers find difficult. The actual pronunciation of a foreign "v sound" is normally not distinguished from a Japanese /b/: for example, there is no meaningful phonological or phonetic difference in pronunciation between Eruvisu (エルヴィス) and Erubisu (エルビス; Elvis"), or between vaiorin (ヴァイオリン) and baiorin (バイオリン; "violin") Vance (2008:81) considers an attempt at rendering [v] to be a "foreignism," in other words, if an innovative Japanese speaker tries to pronounce it, they are treating it as part of a foreign word, rather than of a word that is fully integrated into Japanese lexicon. According to Irwin (2011:73) and Labrune (2012:97–98), the foreign [v] is realized in Japanese as a voiced bilabial fricative, [β], which already exists as an allophone of /b/ in the Yamato and Sino-Japanese strata, although it "seems to be much less fricative than the corresponding Castillan Spanish [sic] sound in lobo for instance". Thus, Venetsia (ヴェネツィア; "Venice") can be phonetically transcribed as [βenetsiɑ]. Irwin is non-committal on the phonemic status of [β]. Bloch (1950:122) suggests a different realization, a "voiced labiodental spirant," thus [v], which is questioned by Vance (1987:32) and rejected by Labrune (2012:97–98). Depending on the source language, a foreign "v sound" (Note: Spelt v in English, French and Italia, w in German, and в in Russian.) can alternatively be rendered (in Hepburn romanization) as b, v or w.

=== Velar nasal onset ===
For some speakers, the velar nasal [ŋ] can occur as an onset in place of the voiced velar plosive [ɡ] in certain conditions. Onset [ŋ], called bidakuon (鼻濁音), is generally restricted to word-internal position, where it may occur either after a vowel (as in 禿, hage, 'baldness' [haŋe]) or after a moraic nasal /N/ (as in 音楽, ongaku, 'music' [oŋŋakɯ~oŋŋakɯ̥]). It is debated whether onset [ŋ] constitutes a separate phoneme or an allophone of /ɡ/. They are written the same way in kana, and native speakers have the intuition that the two sounds belong to the same phoneme. (Note: In contexts requiring specialized linguistic transcription of the [ŋ] sound, such as pronunciation dictionaries, the handakuten diacritic can be added to k-series kana to represent [ŋ]: thus か゚, き゚, く゚, け゚, こ゚ can be used to represent [ŋa, ŋi, ŋɯ, ŋe, ŋo] as opposed to [ɡa, ɡi, ɡɯ, ɡe, ɡo]. However, in ordinary writing か゚, き゚, く゚, け゚, こ゚ are not used, and が, ぎ, ぐ, げ, ご can represent either.)

Speakers can be divided in three groups based on the extent to which they use [ŋ] in contexts where [ɡ] is not required: some consistently use [ŋ], some never use [ŋ], and some show variable use of [ŋ] versus [ɡ] (or [ɣ]). Speakers who consistently use [ŋ] are a minority. The distribution of [ŋ] versus [ɡ] for these speakers mostly follows predictable rules (as described below): however, a number of complications and exceptions exist, and as a result, some linguists analyze /ŋ/ as a distinct phoneme for consistent nasal speakers. The contrast has very low functional load, but it is possible to find or construct some pairs of words that are segmentally identical aside from the use of [ɡ] versus [ŋ] for consistent nasal speakers, such as [oːɡaɾasɯ] (大硝子, 'big sheet of glass') versus [oːŋaɾasɯ] (大烏, 'big raven'). Another commonly cited pair is [seŋɡo] 千五, 'one thousand and five' versus [seŋŋo] 戦後, 'postwar', although aside from the segmental difference in the consonant, these are prosodically distinct: the first is normally pronounced as two accent phrases, [séŋɡó], whereas the second is pronounced as a single accent phrase (either [séŋŋo] or [seŋŋo]).

==== Distribution of [ŋ] vs. [ɡ] ====
At the start of an independent word, all speakers use [ɡ] in almost all circumstances. However, postpositional particles, such as the subject marker が, ga, are pronounced with [ŋ] by consistent nasal speakers. In addition, a few words may be pronounced with [ŋ] even when they occur at the start of an utterance: examples include the conjunction が, ga, 'but' and the word ぐらい, gurai, 'approximately'.

In the middle of a native morpheme, consistent nasal speakers always use [ŋ]. But in the middle of foreign-stratum morphemes, [ɡ] may be used even by consistent nasal speakers. It is also possible for foreign morphemes to be pronounced with medial [ŋ]: there is considerable variability, but this may be more common in older borrowings (such as オルガン, orugan, 'organ', from Portuguese órgão) or in borrowings that contained [ŋ] in the source language (such as イギリス, igirisu, 'England', from Portuguese inglês).

At the start of a morpheme in the middle of a word, either [ŋ] or [ɡ] may be possible, depending on the word. Only [ɡ] is possible after the honorific prefix お, o (as in お元気, ogenki, 'health' [oɡenki]) or at the start of a reduplicated mimetic morpheme (as in がらがら, gara-gara, 'rattle-rattle' [ɡaɾaɡaɾa]). Consistent nasal speakers typically use [ŋ] at the start of the second morpheme of a bimorphemic Sino-Japanese word, or at the start of a morpheme that has undergone rendaku (that is, one that begins with /k/ when pronounced as an independent word). In cases where the second morpheme in a compound starts with [ɡ] when used independently, the compound might be pronounced with either [ɡ] or [ŋ] by consistent nasal speakers: factors such as the lexical stratum of the morpheme may play a role, but it seems difficult to establish precise rules predicting which pronunciation occurs in this context, and the pronunciation of some words varies even among consistent nasal speakers, such as 縞柄, shimagara, 'striped pattern' [ɕimaɡaɾa~ɕimaŋaɾa].

The morpheme 五, go, 'five', is pronounced with [ɡ] when it is used as part of a compound numeral, as in [ɲi(d)ʑɯːgo] 二十五, nijū-go, 'twenty-five' (accented as [ɲí(d)ʑɯːgó]), although 五 can potentially be pronounced as [ŋo] when it occurs non-initially in certain proper nouns or lexicalized compound words, such as [tameŋoɾoː] 為五郎 (a male given name), [ɕitɕiŋosaɴ] 七五三 (the name of a festival for children aged seven, five or three), or [(d)ʑɯːŋoja] 十五夜 (a night of the full moon).

To summarize:

	in the middle of a morpheme	at the start of a word	at the start of a morpheme, in the middle of a word
	はげ, hage, 'baldness'	外遊, gaiyū, 'overseas trip'	at the start of a morpheme, in the middle of a word
inconsistent speakers	[haŋe] or [haɡe] or [haɣe]	[ɡaijɯː], but not *[ŋaijɯː]	sometimes [ŋ], sometimes [ɡ]~[ɣ]
consistent nasal speakers	[haŋe]	[ɡaijɯː], but not *[ŋaijɯː]	sometimes [ŋ], sometimes [ɡ]~[ɣ]
consistent stop speakers	[haɡe] or [haɣe]	[ɡaijɯː], but not *[ŋaijɯː]	[ɡ] or [ɣ]

==== Sociolinguistics of [ŋ] ====
The frequency of onset [ŋ] in Tokyo Japanese speech was falling as of 2008, and seems to have already been on the decline in 1940. Pronunciations with [ŋ] are generally less frequent for younger speakers, and even though the use of [ŋ] was traditionally prescribed as a feature of standard Japanese, pronunciations with [ɡ] seem in practice to have acquired a more prestigious status, as shown by studies that find higher rates of [ɡ] usage when speakers read words from a list. The frequency of [ŋ] also varies by region: it is rare in the southwestern Kansai dialects, but more common in the northeastern Tohoku dialects, with an intermediate frequency in the Kanto dialects (which includes the Tokyo dialect).

== Vowels ==
The vowels of Standard Japanese on a vowel chart. Adapted from Okada (1999:117).

Vowel phonemes of Japanese
	Front	Central	Back
Close	i		u
Mid	e		o
Open		a	

- /a/ is central. Okada (1999:117) shows a fronter quality, [ä], while Vance (2008:54) shows a backer quality, [ɑ̟].
- /e, o/ are mid [e̞, o̞].
- /u/ is a close near-back vowel with the lips unrounded [ɯ̟] or compressed [ɯ̟ᵝ]. When compressed, it is pronounced with the side portions of the lips in contact but with no salient protrusion. In conversational speech, compression may be weakened or completely dropped. It is centralized [ɨ] after /s, z, t/ and palatalized consonants (/Cj/), and possibly also after /n/. In contradiction to the preceding descriptions, Nogita & Yamane (2019) characterize /u/ as rounded and propose that the transcription [ʉ̜] is more accurate than [ɯ], while acknowledging the possibility of unrounding in fast speech. Based on visual recordings of Japanese speakers' lips, they conclude that /u/ is pronounced with lip protrusion (forward motion causing the lip corners to be brought closer together horizontally), in contrast to the spread lip position of a vowel like /i/, or the vertical movement of the lips towards each other for the [β] allophone of /b/. They suggest that the perceptual impression of Japanese /u/ as an unrounded vowel could be caused partly by its fronted articulation, and partly by its protrusion being accompanied by less vertical lip closure compared to /u/ in other languages, resulting in a less rounded sound. Lip protrusion was also found to be greater for Japanese /u/ than for /i/ in a 2005 MRI study and in a 1997 study using x-ray microbeam kinematic data. A 2012 study using electromagnetic tracking observed Japanese /u/ to have greater lip protrusion in angry or sad emotional contexts than in emotionally neutral speech.
- All vowels are more centralized in prose than in individual words. The more careful the pronunciation, the less centralized the vowels are.

=== Long vowels and vowel sequences ===
All vowels display a length contrast: short vowels are phonemically distinct from long vowels:

[obasaɴ]	伯母さん, obasan, 'aunt'	[obaːsaɴ]	お祖母さん, obāsan, 'grandmother'
[keɡeɴ]	怪訝, kegen, 'dubious'	[keːɡeɴ]	軽減, keigen, 'reduction'
[çirɯ]	蛭, hiru, 'leech'	[çiːrɯ]	ヒール, hīru, 'heel'
[tokai]	都会, tokai, 'city'	[toːkai]	倒壊, tōkai, 'destruction'
[kɯ]	区, ku, 'district'	[kɯː]	空, kū, 'void'

Long vowels are pronounced with around 2.5 or 3 times the phonetic duration of short vowels, but are considered to be two moras long at the phonological level. In normal speech, a "double vowel", that is, a sequence of two identical short vowels (for example, across morpheme boundaries), is pronounced the same way as a long vowel. However, in slow or formal speech, a sequence of two identical short vowels may be pronounced differently from an intrinsically long vowel:

[satoːja]	砂糖屋, satō-ya, 'sugar shop'
[satoːja]~[sato.oja]	里親, sato-oya, 'foster parent'
[sɯ́ːɾi]	数理, sūri, 'mathematical theory'
[sɯ́ːɾi]~[sɯ́.ɯɾi]	酢売り, su-uri, 'vinegar seller'

A waveform of a male speaker for baai (場合; 'case'), drawn in Praat, based on a recording from the mobile application of NHK Broadcasting Culture Research Institute (2025).

In the above transcriptions, [.] represents hiatus between two identical vowels at morpheme boundaries (which may occur when a speaker wishes to disambiguate an utterance). In the waveforms of carefully pronounced samples, a slight "dip in intensity" has been observed at the morpheme boundary between sato and oya in sato-oya (里親), but not in satō-ya (砂糖屋) where such a boundary is not present. There is disagreement as to what causes this dip. Bloch (1950:105) describes it as "a diminution in loudness between the two vowels (sometimes accompanied by a slight glottal constriction) and a renewed pulse of expiration on the second." Martin (1952:13) says that it is a "glottal stop", which the author considered a phoneme, and that "this phoneme also represents the glottal constriction associated with vowel rearticulation." Labrune (2012:45) says it can be "a pause or a light glottal stop". Both Martin and Labrune adopt the transcription [ˀ], a superscript glottal stop letter. Vance, following Martin, used the term "vowel rearticulation" and transcribed it as [ˀ] at first, but now adopts [*]. (Note: Vance does not elaborate on the articulation of [*]. In justifying the choice of the asterisk in his transcription, he cites Ladefoged & Maddieson (1996:76–77), who use it in a description of the Gimi language and describe it as "voiced, and involves some glottal activity" and "might better be called a creaky voiced glottal approximant rather than a stop.") Vance's notion of "vowel rearticulation" has been criticized for citing Bloch's spurious phonetic description without proposing an alternative, such as whether palatal or labial glides can separate two identical vowels across morpheme boundaries, as in 委員会, i-inkai, 'committee' and 場合, ba-ai, 'circumstance'. Given that the voicing of the vowels, facilitated by the vibration of the vocal folds, is not interrupted during hiatus, Shibatani (1990) states that there is no complete glottal closure, questions whether there is any actual glottal narrowing at all, and notes that the articulation of the second vowel in su-uri (酢売り) involves slight labial narrowing. However, full glottal stops (with interrupted voicing) have been found to occur through acoustic analyses (previous descriptions by Bloch, Martin and Vance were impressionistic), albeit seldom in individual words and much less commonly even in slowly read sentences.

In fast speech, a sequence of two identical short vowels may fuse into one long vowel. This applies not only to sato-oya (里親) and su-uri (酢売り), but also to any two identical vowels straddling morpheme or word boundaries: kai-in (会員; [kai.iɴ ~ kaiːɴ], 'member'), aku-un (悪運; [akɯ.ɯɴ ~ akɯːɴ], 'bad luck'), akai ie (赤い家; [akai ié ~ akaiːé], 'red house'), Tōkyō ni iku (東京に行く; [toːkʲoː ni ikɯ ~ toːkʲoː niːkɯ], 'go to Tokyo'), Tarō ni inu o yaru (太郎に犬を遣る; [táɾoː ni inɯ́ o jaɾɯ ~ táɾoː niːnɯ́ o jaɾɯ], 'give Tarō a dog').

A double vowel may bear pitch accent on either the first or second element, whereas an intrinsically long vowel can be accented only on its first mora. The distinction between double vowels and long vowels may be phonologically analyzed in various ways. One analysis interprets long vowels as ending in a special segment /R/ (or sometimes notated as /H/; in Japanese publications, the length mark ー is used) that adds a mora to the preceding vowel sound (a chroneme). Another analysis interprets long vowels as sequences of the same vowel phoneme twice, with double vowels distinguished by the presence of a "zero consonant" or empty onset between the vowels. A third approach also interprets long vowels as sequences of the same vowel phoneme twice, but treats the difference between long and double vowels as a matter of syllabification, with the long vowel [oː] consisting of the phonemes /oo/ pronounced in one syllable, and the double vowel [o.o] consisting of the same two phonemes split between two syllables.

Any pair of short vowels may occur in sequence (although only a subset of vowel sequences can be found within a morpheme in native or Sino-Japanese vocabulary). Sequences of three or more vowels also occur. Similar to the distinction between long vowels and double vowels, some analyses of Japanese phonology recognize a distinction between diphthongs (two different vowel phonemes pronounced in one syllable) and heterosyllabic vowel sequences; other analyses make no such distinction.

For certain verbs and adjectives with predictable accent locations, whether to phonologically analyze a sequence of two identical vowels as two separate vowels or a single continuous long vowel is a matter of convention, preference or accentual rules. For example, most accented verbs are predictably accented on the penultimate mora: thus ōu ~ oou (覆う) is considered to have one long vowel if unaccented, as in /oRɯ/, but two separate vowels if accented, as in /oóɯ/. However, tōru (通る) and tōsu (通す) are always accented on their antepenultimate mora, and this seemingly irregular location is attributed to a leftward accent shift to avoid accenting the special mora /R/, which is almost always unaccentable and has been termed "deficient". Thus, these two verbs are said to have single long vowels, as in /*toŔɾɯ → tóRɾɯ/ and /*toŔsɯ → tóRsɯ/.

Like accented verbs, most accented adjectives are also predictably accented on the penultimate mora, but for ōi ~ ooi (多い), some speakers accent the antepenultimate mora, pronouncing it as /óRi/ with a long vowel, while others accent the penultimate mora, pronouncing it as /oói/ with two short /o/ sounds. Other forms of this verb, such as ōku ~ ooku (多く), are accented on the antepenultimate mora (/óRkɯ/) in the conservative variety of Tokyo Japanese, and accented on the penultimate mora (/oókɯ/) in the innovating variety. On the other hand, while tōi (遠い; /toRi/) and tōku (遠く; /toRkɯ/) are both unaccented and said to have one long vowel, tookute (遠くて) is accented and has two vowels (/toókɯte/) because of an accentual rule that applies to all unaccented adjectives followed by the particle te (て). tooi ga ~ tōi ga (遠いが) conservatively has two vowels (/toói ɡa/) and innovatingly has one long vowel (/toRí ɡa/) because of the different rule-based locations of the accent in the two varieties. Overall, in these particular cases, whether a double /o/ is treated as one long vowel /oR/ or two vowels /oo/ depends ad hoc on whether the second /o/ is accented.

As noted above, adjectival forms ending in -ku (～く) are accented conservatively on the antepenultimate mora and innovatingly on the penultimate one. Yet for ōkiku (大きく), the recommended patterns are conservatively on the preantepenultimate mora, as in /óRkikɯ/, and innovatingly on the penultimate one, /oRkíkɯ/. In both cases, accentuating the antepenultimate mora is avoided and it maintains its status as the lengthening mora /R/. The antepenultimate-accented pattern, /oókikɯ/, with two identical vowels rather than one long vowel, has not been widely recommended, although at least one source has claimed it is plausible. The antepenultimate mora of chiisaku (小さく) is similarly maintained as /R/ in two patterns: conservative /tɕíRsakɯ/ and innovating /tɕiRsákɯ/. On the other hand, in ooshiku (雄々しく), the two vowels result from a reduplication of the morpheme o (雄), therefore have a morpheme boundary between them, and the conservative pattern is simply /oóɕikɯ/.

-Ku (～く) forms historically can lose the consonant /k/, which gives rise to long vowels by means of vowel fusion, as in arigataku (ありがたく; /aɾiɡátakɯ/) → arigatō (ありがとう; /aɾíɡatoR/). These -u (～う) forms are found in non-Tokyo dialects, as well as in "super-polite" adjectival expressions with gozaimasu (ございます) in Tokyo Japanese, as in arigatō gozaimasu (ありがとうございます; 'I am thankful'). When kowaku (怖く; /kówakɯ/) is used this way, the result would be koō gozaimasu (怖うございます; /kóoR ɡozaimasɯ/, 'it is scary'), with a potentially triply long vowel. Phonetically, a bilabial glide has been said to be added, which would yield [kó̞β̞òː̀], on account of the same glide existing in /kówakɯ/, but the actual production of that glide, which does not normally occur before the vowel /o/, by native speakers, is inconclusive. As for toō (遠う; /tooR/) and oō (多う; /óoR/), 16th-century transcriptions such as touô and vouô by European missionaries show that of the three /o/'s, only the last two formed a long vowel. (Note: Despite the spellings with v and u, the labial glide was disappearing before /o, i, e/ by this time. It persisted only before /a/ (spelt va or ua) to this day, although /waɯ/ in particular evolved into /wɔR/ (spelt vŏ or uŏ) and ultimately /oR/. According to Frellesvig (2010:11), vo and uo corresponded to /o/, vô and uô to /oR/ (the author uses /oo/), vŏ and uŏ to /ɔR/ (but phonetically, with a labial glide, [β̞ɔː]), and quŏ to /kwɔR/.) An Ōita dialect uses a different vowel quality for the last two vowels in these cases, roughly /áɯR/ (青う) and /óɯR/ (多う), compared to the Tokyo /áoR/ and /óoR/. The auxiliary -u (～う) (historically -mu (～む)) probably has the same effect in some verbs, such as toō < towau (問おう; /toóH/, 'let's ask/inquire'), koō < kowau (乞おう; /koóH/, 'let's ask/request'), hiroō < hirowau (拾おう; /hiɾoóH/, 'let's pick up'), whose stems used to contain a labial glide. It has been suggested that these cases of "triple o" may actually be pronounced as mere "double o".

There are other cases where losses of consonants also result in long vowels. In adjectives, /k/ completely disappeared from historical -ki (～き) forms, resulting in -i (～い) forms such as kanashii (悲しい; /kanaɕiR/), ureshii (嬉しい; /ɯɾeɕíR/), etc. In verbs, the intervocalic labial fricative /ɸ/ disappeared from historical -fu (～ふ) forms, resulting in verbs like kuu (食う; /kɯ́R/). Classical Japanese verbs, recited in the modern Tokyo accent, frequently contain long vowels at the end because of such -u (～う) forms (still spelt with the kana ふ, though), while their modern equivalents (other than the said kuu) do not, for example, warō (笑(わら)ふ; /waɾoR/) → warau (笑(わら)う; /waɾaɯ/), omō (思ふ; /omóR/) → omou (思う; /omóɯ/). In some cases such as suu (吸う; [sɨ́ɯ̈́ ~ sɨ́ː́]), nuu (縫う; [nɨ́ɯ̈̀ ~ nɨ́ː̀]), the centralizing effect of [s, n] on the first /ɯ/, phonetically [ɨ], may cause variation among speakers, some of whom have long vowels while others have a sequence of two short vowels; compare the noun sū (数; [sɨ́ː̀]), where only a long vowel is said to occur. In the case of yuu (言(い)う; [jɨ́ː́]), the fusion of the historical vowel sequence /iɯ/ resulted in a long vowel, despite the kana spelling.

=== Devoicing ===
Japanese vowels are sometimes phonetically voiceless. There is no phonemic contrast between voiced and voiceless versions of a vowel, but the use of voiceless vowels is often described as an obligatory feature of standard Tokyo Japanese, in that it sounds unnatural to use a voiced vowel in positions where devoicing is usual. Devoicing mainly affects the short high (close) vowels /i/ and /u/ when they are preceded by a voiceless consonant and followed by a second voiceless consonant or by a pause. These vowels are normally not devoiced if they are either preceded or followed by a voiced consonant or by another vowel, although occasional exceptions to this have been observed.

==== /i u/ between voiceless consonants or before a pause ====
In general, a high vowel (/i/ or /u/) between two voiceless consonants is very likely to be devoiced if the second consonant is a stop or affricate, or if the first is a stop and the second is a voiceless fricative other than /h/.

[ɕi̥ka]	/sika/	鹿, shika, 'deer'
[kɯ̥tsɯ́]	/kutú/	靴, kutsu, 'shoe'
[kɯ̥sá]	/kusá/	草, kusa, 'grass'

Devoicing of /i/ and /u/ between voiceless consonants is not restricted to fast speech and occurs even in careful pronunciation. Devoicing is inhibited if the second consonant is /h/ and also (to a somewhat lesser extent) if the second consonant is a fricative and the first consonant is a fricative or affricate. There is also a tendency to avoid devoicing both vowels when two consecutive syllables (or moras) contain high vowels between voiceless consonants: nevertheless, it is possible for both vowels to be devoiced in this context (perhaps especially in fast speech). Some older descriptions state that the presence of pitch accent on a mora inhibits devoicing of its vowel, but for young contemporary speakers, it seems to be possible to devoice accented vowels.

Avoidance of consecutive devoicing can be seen in pronunciations such as the following:

[kɯ́ɕi̥kɯmo]	/kúsikumo/	奇しくも, kushikumo, 'strangely'
[reki̥ɕiteki]	/rekisiteki/	歴史的, rekishi-teki, 'historic'
[takitsɯ̥kérɯ]	/takitukéru/	焚き付ける, takitsukeru, 'to kindle'

Devoicing can affect word-final /i/ or /u/. A word-final high vowel is likely to be devoiced when it is preceded by a voiceless consonant and followed without pause (or with little pause) by a word that starts with a voiceless consonant within the same phrase. A word-final high vowel may also be devoiced when preceded by a voiceless consonant and followed by a 'pause' at a phrase boundary. Devoicing between a voiceless consonant and a pause seems to occur with less overall consistency than devoicing between voiceless consonants. Final /u/ is frequently devoiced in the common sentence-ending copula です, desu and polite suffix ます, masu. Phrase-final vowels are not devoiced when the phrase carries the rising intonation associated with an interrogative sentence, as in the question 行きます?, Ikimasu?, '(Will you) go?'.

==== Atypical devoicing ====
A high vowel may occasionally be devoiced after a voiceless consonant even when the following sound is voiced. Devoicing in this context seems to occur more often before nasals or approximants than before other voiced consonant sounds. In particular, the final /su/ in desu and masu shows a relatively high devoicing rate before the particles yo and wa. Some studies have also found rare examples of voiceless vowels after voiced consonants. Per Vance 2008, high vowels are not devoiced next to a voiced segment in careful pronunciation.

The non-high vowels /a o e/ are sometimes devoiced, usually between voiceless consonants; devoicing of these vowels is infrequent, optional, varies between speakers, and can be affected by speech rate. In theory, /a o/ must be unaccented, surrounded by voiceless consonants, and followed by the same vowel in the next mora in order to devoice. The least commonly devoiced vowel has been reported to be /e/, although a 2005 study of a corpus of spontaneous speech found lower devoicing rates for /a/; it is unclear which vowel is actually least likely to devoice.

[ko̥kóɾo]	心, kokoro, 'heart'
[ho̥koɾí]	誇り, hokori, 'pride'
[hḁká]	墓, haka, 'tomb'
[se̥kkakɯ]	折角, sekkaku, 'on purpose'
[ke̥ɕóː]	化粧, keshō, 'makeup'

==== Phonetics of devoicing ====
Two spectrograms of two speakers, from left to right male then female, for shitai (死体; 'corpse').

Two spectrograms of two speakers, from left to right male then female, for shutai (主体; 'subject').

All spectrograms were drawn in Praat. The male speakers' spectrograms on the left-hand side are based on recordings from the mobile application of NHK Broadcasting Culture Research Institute (2025). The female speakers' spectrograms on the right-hand side are based on recording from the mobile application of Yamada et al. (2020).

A so-called "devoiced vowel" does not necessarily surface as a discrete acoustic segment. In some cases, especially after a fricative, it likely disappears altogether, with no identifiable separation between the consonant and the "vowel" at all. Despite its hiddenness, the "vowel" still rhythmically contributes to a full mora, and still exerts assimilatory effects on the consonant, namely palatalization for /i/ and lip compression or velarization for /u/, hence the following realizations:

[kʲɕoː]	気象, kishō, 'weather'
[kɕoː~kʷɕoː~kˠɕoː]	苦笑, kushō, 'bitter smile'
[ɕtɑi]	死体, shitai, 'corpse'
[ɕʷtɑi~ɕˠtɑi]	主体, shutai, 'subject'

Phonetically, a devoiced vowel may sound similar or identical to a voiceless fricative: for example, the devoiced /i/ of kitai sounds like the voiceless palatal fricative [ç]. Sometimes there is no clear acoustic boundary between the sound of a devoiced vowel and the sound of the preceding voiceless consonant phoneme. For example, although the word /suta↓iru/ is phonemically analyzed as starting with a consonant phoneme /s/ followed by a devoiced vowel phoneme /u/, acoustically it may sound like it starts with a fricative [s] that is sustained up until the following [t], with no third sound intervening between these two consonant sounds.

Some analysts have proposed that 'devoiced' vowels may actually be deleted in some circumstances, either at the phonetic level or at some level of the phonology. However, it has been argued in response that other phenomena show at least the underlying presence of a vowel phoneme:

- Prosodically, vowel devoicing does not affect the mora count of a word.
- Even when the vowel of a CV sequence is devoiced and appears to be deleted, the pronunciation of the preceding consonant phoneme shows coarticulatory effects.
- When a vowel is devoiced between two identical voiceless fricatives, the result is typically not pronounced as a single long fricative. Instead, two acoustically distinct fricative segments are usually produced, although it may be difficult to describe the acoustic characteristics of the sound that separates them. In this context, alternative pronunciations involving a voiced vowel are more common than they are between other voiceless sounds. The contrast in pronunciation between a long (geminated) fricative and a sequence of two identical fricatives separated by a devoiced vowel phoneme can be illustrated by pairs such as the following:

/niQsiNbasi/	[ɲiɕːimbaɕi]	日進橋, Nisshinbashi	vs.	/nisisiNbasi/	[ɲiɕi̥ɕimbaɕi] or [ɲiɕiɕimbaɕi]	西新橋, Nishi-shinbashi
/keQsai/	[kesːai]	決済, 'check out'	vs.	/kesusai/	[kesɯ̥sai] or [kesɯsai]	消す際, 'while erasing'

==== Sociolinguistics of devoicing ====
Japanese speakers are usually not even aware of the difference of the voiced and devoiced pair. On the other hand, gender roles play a part in prolonging the terminal vowel: it is regarded as effeminate to prolong, particularly the terminal /u/ as in あります, arimasu, 'there is'.

=== Nasalization ===
Vowels are nasalized before the moraic nasal /N/ (or equivalently, before a syllable-final nasal).

=== Glottal stop insertion ===
A glottal stop [ʔ] may occur before a vowel at the beginning of an utterance, or after a vowel at the end of an utterance. This is demonstrated below with the following words (as pronounced in isolation):

/eN/ > [eɴ] ~ [ʔeɴ]	円, en, 'yen'
/kisi/ > [kiɕiʔ]	岸, kishi, 'shore'
/u/ > [ɯʔ ~ ʔɯʔ]	鵜, u, 'cormorant'

When an utterance-final word is uttered with emphasis, the presence of a glottal stop is noticeable to native speakers, and it may be indicated in writing with the sokuon っ, suggesting it is identified with the moraic obstruent /Q/ (normally found as the first half of a geminate). This is also found in interjections like あっ, a and えっ, e.

An attempt at producing a glottal stop may not be complete, which may result in a period of creaky voice and be characterized as a "near miss." As demonstrated by a token of 開ける, akeru, 'open', there's a "clean" glottal stop before the initial vowel /a/, but a "near miss" at the end of the final vowel /u/: [ʔɑkeɾɯɯ̰].

Glottal stops have also been found medially between two identical vowels. See #Long vowels and vowel sequences.

== Prosody ==
=== Moras ===
Japanese words have traditionally been analysed as composed of moras, a distinct concept from that of syllables. (Note: Moras are represented orthographically in katakana and hiragana – each mora, with the exception of CjV clusters, being one kana – and are referred to in Japanese as on.) Each mora occupies one rhythmic unit, i.e. it is perceived to have the same time value. A mora may be "regular" consisting of just a vowel (V) or a consonant and a vowel (CV), or may be one of two "special" moras, /N/ and /Q/. A glide /j/ may precede the vowel in "regular" moras (CjV). Some analyses posit a third "special" mora, /R/, the second part of a long vowel (a chroneme). (Note: Also notated /H/, following the conventional usage of h for lengthened vowels in romanization.) In the following table, the period represents a mora break, rather than the conventional syllable break.

Mora type	Example	Japanese	Moras per word
V	/o/	尾, o, 'tail'	1-mora word
jV	/jo/	世, yo, 'world'	1-mora word
CV	/ko/	子, ko, 'child'	1-mora word
CjV	/kjo/^{1}	巨, kyo, 'hugeness'	1-mora word
R	/R/ in /kjo.R/ or /kjo.o/	今日, kyō, 'today'	2-mora word
N	/N/ in /ko.N/	紺, kon, 'deep blue'	2-mora word
Q	/Q/ in /ko.Q.ko/ or /ko.k.ko/	国庫, kokko, 'national treasury'	3-mora word

^1 Traditionally, moras were divided into plain and palatal sets, the latter of which entail palatalization of the consonant element.

Thus, the disyllabic [ɲip.poɴ] (日本, 'Japan') may be analyzed as /niQpoN/, dissected into four moras: /ni/, /Q/, /po/, and /N/.

In English, stressed syllables in a word are pronounced louder, longer, and with higher pitch, while unstressed syllables are relatively shorter in duration. Japanese is often considered a mora-timed language, as each mora tends to be of the same length, though not strictly: geminate consonants and moras with devoiced vowels may be shorter than other moras. Factors such as pitch have negligible influence on mora length.

=== Pitch accent ===
Standard Japanese has a distinctive pitch accent system where a word can either be unaccented, or can bear an accent on one of its moras. An accented mora is pronounced with a relatively high tone and is followed by a drop in pitch.

The pitch of other moras in the word (or more precisely, in the accent phrase) is predictable. A common simplified model describes pitch patterns in terms of a two-way division between low- and high-pitched moras. Low pitch is found on all moras following the accented mora (if there is one) and usually also on the first mora of the accent phrase (unless it bears the accent). High pitch is found on the accented mora (if there is one) and on non-initial moras up to the accented mora, or up to the end of the accent phrase if there is no accented mora.

Under this model, it is not possible to distinguish the pitch patterns of an unaccented phrase and a phrase with accent on the final mora: both show low pitch on the first mora and high pitch on every following mora. It is generally said that there is no audible difference between these two accentuation patterns. (Some acoustic experiments have found evidence that some speakers may produce slightly different phonetic pitch contours for these two accentuation patterns; however, even when such differences exist, they do not seem to be perceptible to listeners.) Nevertheless, there is a lexical distinction between unaccented words and words accented on the final mora, which is made apparent when the word is followed by further material within the same accent phrase. For example, even though there is no perceptible difference between /hasi/ 端, 'edge' and /hasí/ 橋, 'bridge' when pronounced in isolation, there is a clear contrast between /hasiɡa/ (端が, 'edge nom') and /hasíɡa/ (橋が, 'bridge nom'), where these words are followed by the case particle が.

The placement of pitch accent, and the lowering of pitch on an initial unaccented mora, show some restrictions that can be explained in terms of syllable structure. Accent cannot be placed on the second mora of a heavy (bimoraic) syllable (which may be /Q/, /N/, or the second mora of a long vowel or diphthong). An initial unaccented mora isn't always pronounced with low pitch when it occurs as part of a heavy syllable. Specifically, when the second mora of an accent phrase is /R/ (the latter part of a long vowel) or /N/ (the moraic nasal), the first two moras are optionally either LH (low-high) or HH (high-high). In contrast, when the second mora is /Q/ the first two moras are LL (low-low). When the second mora is /i/, initial lowering seems to apply as usual to the first mora only, LH (low-high). Labrune (2012) rejects the use of the syllable in descriptions of Japanese phonology and so explains these phenomena alternatively as a consequence of /N/, /Q/, /R/ constituting "deficient moras", a term Labrune suggests can also encompass moras without an onset, with a devoiced vowel, or with an epenthetic vowel.

Different dialects of Japanese have different accent systems: some distinguish a greater number of contrastive pitch patterns than the Tokyo dialect, while others make fewer distinctions.

=== Feet ===
The bimoraic foot, a unit composed of two moras, plays an important role in linguistic analyses of Japanese prosody. The relevance of the bimoraic foot can be seen in the formation of hypocoristic names, clipped compounds, and shortened forms of longer words.

For example, the hypocoristic suffix -chan is attached to the end of a name to form an affectionate term of address. When this suffix is used, the name may be unchanged in form, or it may optionally be modified: modified forms always have an even number of moras before the suffix. It is common to use the first two moras of the base name, but there are also variations that are not produced by simple truncation: (Note: In content, all examples are taken from Poser (1990:82–89); however, the original phonemic transcriptions have been altered and mora boundaries and romanizations have been added.)

Truncation to the first two moras:

/o.sa.mu/	osamu	>	/o.sa.tja.N/	osachan
/ta.ro.ː/	taroo	>	/ta.ro.tja.N/	tarochan
/jo.ː.su.ke/	yoosuke	>	/jo.ː.tja.N/	yoochan
/ta.i.zo.ː/	taizoo	>	/ta.i.tja.N/	taichan
/ki.N.su.ke/	kinsuke	>	/ki.N.tja.N/	kinchan

From first mora, with lengthening:

/ti/	chi	>	/ti.ː.tja.N/	chiichan
/ka.yo.ko/	kayoko	>	/ka.ː.tja.N/	kaachan

With formation of a moraic obstruent:

/a.tu.ko/	atsuko	>	/a.Q.tja.N/	atchan
/mi.ti.ko/	michiko	>	/mi.Q.tja.N/	mitchan
/bo.ː/	boo	>	/bo.Q.tja.N/	botchan

With formation of a moraic nasal:

/a.ni/	ani	>	/a.N.tja.N/	anchan
/me.ɡu.mi/	megumi	>	/me.N.tja.N/	menchan
/no.bu.ko/	nobuko	>	/no.N.tja.N/	nonchan

From two non-adjacent moras:

/a.ki.ko/	akiko	>	/a.ko.tja.N/	akochan
/mo.to.ko/	motoko	>	/mo.ko.tja.N/	mokochan

Poser (1990) argues that the various kinds of modifications are best explained in terms of a two-mora 'template' used in the formation of this type of hypocoristic: the bimoraic foot.

Aside from the bimoraic foot as shown above, in some analyses monomoraic (one-mora) feet (also called "degenerate" feet) or trimoraic (three-mora) feet are considered to occur in certain contexts.

=== Syllables ===
Although there is debate about the usefulness or relevance of syllables to the phonology of Japanese, it is possible to analyze Japanese words as being divided into syllables. When setting Japanese lyrics to (modern Western-style) music, a single note may correspond either to a mora or to a syllable.

Normally, each syllable contains at least one vowel and has a length of either one mora (called a light syllable) or two moras (called a heavy syllable); thus, the structure of a typical Japanese syllable can be represented as (C)(j)V(V/N/Q), where C represents an onset consonant, V represents a vowel, N represents a moraic nasal, Q represents a moraic obstruent, components in parentheses are optional, and components separated by a slash are mutually exclusive. However, other, more marginal syllable types (such as trimoraic syllables or vowelless syllables) may exist in restricted contexts.

The majority of syllables in spontaneous Japanese speech are 'light', that is, one mora long, with the form (C)(j)V.

==== Heavy syllables ====
"Heavy" syllables (two moras long) may potentially take any of the following forms:

- (C)(j)VN (ending in a short vowel + /N/)
- (C)(j)VQ (ending in a short vowel + /Q/)
- (C)(j)VR (ending in a long vowel). May be analyzed either as a special case of (C)(j)VV with both V as the same vowel phoneme, or as ending in a vowel followed by a special chroneme segment (written as R or sometimes H).
- (C)(j)V₁V₂, where V₁ is different from V₂. Sometimes notated as (C)(j)VJ.

Some descriptions of Japanese phonology refer to a VV sequence within a syllable as a diphthong; others use the term "quasi-diphthong" as a means of clarifying that these are analyzed as sequences of two vowel phonemes within one syllable, rather than as unitary phonemes. There is disagreement about which non-identical vowel sequences can occur within the same syllable. One criterion used to evaluate this question is the placement of pitch accent: it has been argued that, like syllables ending in long vowels, syllables ending in diphthongs cannot bear a pitch accent on their final mora. It has also been argued that diphthongs, like long vowels, cannot normally be pronounced with a glottal stop or vowel rearticulation between their two moras, whereas this may optionally occur between two vowels that belong to separate syllables. Kubozono (2015a) argues that only /ai/, /oi/ and /ui/ can be diphthongs, although some prior literature has included other sequences such as /ae/, /ao/, /oe/, /au/, when they occur within a morpheme. Labrune (2012) argues against the syllable as a unit of Japanese phonology and thus concludes that no vowel sequences ought to be analyzed as diphthongs.

In some contexts, a VV sequence that could form a valid diphthong is separated by a syllable break at a morpheme boundary, as in /kuruma.ído/ 'well with a pulley' from /kuruma/ 'wheel, car' and /ído/ 'well'. However, the distinction between a heterosyllabic vowel sequence and a long vowel or diphthong is not always predictable from the position of morpheme boundaries: that is, syllable breaks between vowels do not always correspond to morpheme boundaries (or vice versa).

For example, some speakers may pronounce the word 炎, honoo, 'flame' with a heterosyllabic /o.o/ sequence, even though this word is arguably monomorphemic in modern Japanese. This is an exceptional case: for the most part, heterosyllabic sequences of two identical short vowels are found only across a morpheme boundary. On the other hand, it is not so rare for a heterosyllabic sequence of two non-identical vowels to occur within a morpheme.

In addition, it seems to be possible in some cases for a VV sequence to be pronounced in one syllable even across a morpheme boundary. For example, 歯医者, haisha, 'dentist' is morphologically a compound of 歯, ha, 'tooth' and 医者, isha, 'medical doctor' (itself composed of the morphemes 医, i, 'medical' and 者, sha, 'person'); despite the morpheme boundary between /a/ and /i/ in this word, they seem to be pronounced in one syllable as a diphthong, making it a homophone with 敗者, haisha, 'defeated person'. Likewise, the morpheme /i/ used as a suffix to form the dictionary form (or affirmative nonpast-tense form) of an i-adjective is almost never pronounced as a separate syllable; instead, it combines with a preceding stem-final /i/ to form the long vowel [iː], or with a preceding stem-final /a/, /o/ or /u/ to form a diphthong.

==== Superheavy syllables ====
Syllables of three or more moras, called "superheavy" syllables, are uncommon and exceptional (or "marked"); the extent to which they occur in Japanese words is debated. Superheavy syllables never occur within a morpheme in Yamato or Sino-Japanese. Apparent superheavy syllables can be found in certain morphologically derived Yamato forms (including inflected verb forms where a suffix starting with /t/ is attached to a root ending in -VVC-, derived adjectives in っぽい, -ppoi, or derived demonyms in っこ, -kko) as well as in many loanwords.

Apparent superheavy syllables
Syllable type	Examples	
Syllable type	Morphologically complex forms	Loanwords
(C)(j)VRN		English: green → Japanese: グリーン, romanized: gurīn
(C)(j)V₁V₂N		English: Spain → Japanese: スペイン, romanized: supein
(C)(j)VRQ	通った, tootta, 'pass-PAST' 東京っ子, tōkyōkko, 'Tokyoite'	
(C)(j)V₁V₂Q	入って, haitte, 'enter-GERUNDIVE' 仙台っ子, sendaikko, 'Sendai-ite'	
C)(j)VNQ	ロンドンっ子, rondonkko, 'Londoner', ドラえもんっぽい, doraemonppoi, 'like Doraemon'	
C)(j)VRNQ	ウィーンっ子, uiinkko, 'Wiener', ウィーンって言った, uiintte itta, 'Vienna, (s)he said'	

According to some accounts, certain forms listed in the above table may be avoided in favor of a different pronunciation with an ordinary heavy syllable (by reducing a long vowel to a short vowel or a geminate to a singleton consonant). Vance (1987) suggests there might be a strong tendency to reduce superheavy syllables to the length of two moras in speech at a normal conversational speed, saying that tooQta is often indistinguishable from toQta. Vance (2008) again affirms the existence of a tendency to shorten superheavy syllables in speech at a conversational tempo (specifically, to replace VRQ with VQ, VRN with VN, and VNQ with VN), but stipulates that the distinctions between 通った, tootta and 取った, totta; シーン, shiin and 芯, shin; and コンテ, konte, 'script' and 紺って, kontte, 'navy blue-QUOTATIVE' are clearly audible in careful pronunciation. Itō and Mester explicitly deny that there is a general tendency to shorten the long vowel of forms such as tootte in most styles of speech. Ohta (1991) accepts superheavy syllables ending in /RQ/ and /JQ/ but describes /NQ/ as hardly possible, stating that he and the majority of the informants he consulted judged examples such as /roNdoNQko/ to be questionably well-formed in comparison to /roNdoNko/.

It has also been argued that in some cases, an apparent superheavy syllable might actually be a sequence of a light syllable followed by a heavy syllable.

Kubozono (2015c) argues that /VVN/ sequences are generally syllabified as /V.VN/, citing forms where pitch accent is placed on the second vowel such as スペイン風邪, supeínkaze, 'Spanish influenza', リンカーン杯, rinkaánhai, 'Lincoln Cup', グリーン車, guriínsha, 'Green Car' (first-class car of a train) (syllabified per Kubozono as su.pe.in.ka.ze, rin.ka.an.hai, gu.ri.in.sha). Itō & Mester (2018) state that compounds formed from words of this shape often exhibit variable accentuation, citing guríinsha~guriínsha, Uターン率, yuutaánritsu~yuutáanritsu, 'U-turn percentage', and マクリーン館, makuriínkan ~ makuríinkan, 'McLean Building'.

Itō & Mester (2015b) note that the pitch-based criterion for syllabifying VV sequences would suggest that Sendaíkko is syllabified as Sen.da.ik.ko; likewise, Ohta (1991) reports a suggestion by Shin’ichi Tanaka (per personal communication) that the accentuation tookyoókko implies the syllable division -kyo.oQ-, although Ohta favors the analysis with a superheavy syllable based on intuitition that this word contains a long vowel and not a sequence of two separate vowels. Itō and Mester ultimately question whether the placement of pitch accent on the second mora really rules out analyzing a three-mora sequence as a single superheavy syllable.

The word rondonkko has a pronunciation where the pitch accent is placed on /N/: /roNdoŃQko/. Vance (2008) interprets /ŃQ/ here as its own syllable, separate from the preceding vowel, while stating that a variant pronunciation /roNdóNQko/, with a superheavy syllable /dóNQ/, also exists. Itō and Mester consider the syllabification ron.do.nk.ko implausible, and propose that pitch accent, rather than always falling on the first mora of a syllable, may fall on the penultimate mora when a syllable is superheavy. Per Kubozono (2015c), the superheavy syllable in tóotta bears accent on its first mora.

Evidence for the avoidance of superheavy syllables includes the adaptation of foreign long vowels or diphthongs to Japanese short vowels before /N/ in loanwords such as the following:

English: foundation → Japanese: ファンデーション, romanized: fandēshon
English: stainless → Japanese: ステンレス, romanized: sutenresu
English: corned beef → Japanese: コンビーフ, romanized: konbīfu

There are exceptions to this shortening: /ai/ seems to never be affected, and /au/, although often replaced with /a/ in this context, can be kept, as in the following words:

English: sound → Japanese: サウンド, romanized: saundo
English: mountain → Japanese: マウンテン, romanized: maunten

==== Vowelless syllables ====
Some analyses recognize vowelless syllables in restricted contexts.

- Kawahara & Shaw (2018) argue that high vowel deletion may produce syllabic fricatives or affricates.
- Per Vance (2008), /N/ is syllabic in the marginal circumstances where it occurs word-initially, such as ン十億, njūoku, 'several billion'; Vance also considers /NQ/ to constitute its own syllable in the exceptional form rondonkko /roNdoŃQko/ (alternatively analyzed as containing a superheavy syllable; see above) due to the placement of the pitch accent on /N/.

== Phonotactics ==
=== Within a mora ===
Phonotactically legal phoneme sequences, each counting as one mora
	/-a/	/-i/	/-u/	/-e/	/-o/	/-ja/	/-ju/	/-jo/
/∅-/	/a/	/i/	/u/ [ɯ]	/e/	/o/	/ja/	/ju/ [jɯ]	/jo/
/k-/	/ka/	/ki/ [kʲi]	/ku/ [kɯ]	/ke/	/ko/	/kja/ [kʲa]	/kju/ [kʲɨ]	/kjo/ [kʲo]
/ɡ-/	/ɡa/	/ɡi/ [ɡʲi]	/ɡu/ [ɡɯ]	/ɡe/	/ɡo/	/ɡja/ [ɡʲa]	/ɡju/ [ɡʲɨ]	/ɡjo/ [ɡʲo]
/s-/	/sa/	/si/ [ɕi]	/su/ [sɨ]	/se/	/so/	/sja/ [ɕa]	/sju/ [ɕɨ]	/sjo/ [ɕo]
/z-/	/za/ [(d)za]	/zi/ [(d)ʑi]	/zu/ [(d)zɨ]	/ze/ [(d)ze]	/zo/ [(d)zo]	/zja/ [(d)ʑa]	/zju/ [(d)ʑɨ]	/zjo/ [(d)ʑo]
/t-/	/ta/	/ti/ [tɕi]	/tu/ [tsɨ]	/te/	/to/	/tja/ [tɕa]	/tju/ [tɕɨ]	/tjo/ [tɕo]
/d-/	/da/	(/di/) [(d)ʑi]	(/du/) [(d)zɨ]	/de/	/do/	(/dja/) [(d)ʑa]	(/dju/) [(d)ʑɨ]	(/djo/) [(d)ʑo]
/n-/	/na/	/ni/ [ɲi]	/nu/ [nɯ]	/ne/	/no/	/nja/ [ɲa]	/nju/ [ɲɨ]	/njo/ [ɲo]
/h-/	/ha/	/hi/ [çi]	/hu/ [ɸɯ]	/he/	/ho/	/hja/ [ça]	/hju/ [çɨ]	/hjo/ [ço]
/b-/	/ba/	/bi/ [bʲi]	/bu/ [bɯ]	/be/	/bo/	/bja/ [bʲa]	/bju/ [bʲɨ]	/bjo/ [bʲo]
/p-/	/pa/	/pi/ [pʲi]	/pu/ [pɯ]	/pe/	/po/	/pja/ [pʲa]	/pju/ [pʲɨ]	/pjo/ [pʲo]
/m-/	/ma/	/mi/ [mʲi]	/mu/ [mɯ]	/me/	/mo/	/mja/ [mʲa]	/mju/ [mʲɨ]	/mjo/ [mʲo]
/r-/	/ra/ [ɾa]	/ri/ [ɾʲi]	/ru/ [ɾɯ]	/re/ [ɾe]	/ro/ [ɾo]	/rja/ [ɾʲa]	/rju/ [ɾʲɨ]	/rjo/ [ɾʲo]
/w-/	/wa/ [β̞a]							
Marginal combinations mostly found in Western loans
[ɕ-]				[ɕe]				
[(d)ʑ-]				[(d)ʑe]				
[t-]		[tʲi]	[tɯ]				[tʲɨ]	
[tɕ-]				[tɕe]				
[ts-]	[tsa]	[tsʲi]		[tse]	[tso]			
[d-]		[dʲi]	[dɯ]				[dʲɨ]	
[ɸ-]	[ɸa]	[ɸʲi]		[ɸe]	[ɸo]		[ɸʲɨ]	
[j-]				[je]				
[β̞-]		[β̞i]		[β̞e]	[β̞o]			
Special moras
/V-/	/N/ [ɴ, m, n, ɲ, ŋ, ɰ̃]							
/V-C/	/Q/ (geminates the following consonant)							
/V-/	/R/ [ː]							

==== Palatals ====
A Japanese syllable can start with the palatal glide /j/ or with a consonant followed by /j/. These onsets normally can be found only before the back vowels /a o u/.

Before /i/, /j/ never occurs. All consonants are phonetically palatalized before /i/, but do not contrast in this position with unpalatalized consonants: as a result, palatalization in this context can be analyzed as allophonic. In native Japanese vocabulary, coronal obstruent phones (i.e. [t s d (d)z]) do not occur before /i/, and in contexts where a morphological process such as verb inflection would place a coronal obstruent phoneme before /i/, the coronal is replaced with an alveolo-palatal sibilant, resulting in alternations such as [matanai] 'wait' (negative) vs. [matɕimasɯ] 'wait' (polite) or [kasanai] 'lend' (negative) vs. [kaɕimasɯ] 'lend' (polite). Thus, [tɕ ɕ (d)ʑ] function in native vocabulary as the palatalized counterparts of coronal consonant phonemes. However, the analysis of alveolo-palatal sibilants as palatalized allophones of coronal consonants is complicated by loanwords. The sequences [ti di] are distinguished from [tɕi (d)ʑi] in recent loanwords (with [ti] generally preserved in words borrowed more recently than 1930) and to a lesser extent, some speakers may exhibit a contrast in loanwords between [tsi (d)zi si] and [tɕi (d)ʑi ɕi].

Before /e/, [j] was lost in the current standard language. (Note: Some dialects (such as Kyushu) and pre-modern versions of the language contain [je], as well as exhibiting [ɕe] in place of modern standard [se].) The use of the mora [je] in loanwords is inconsistent: adapted pronunciations with [ie] (イエ), such as イエローカード ierōkādo from English yellow card, continue to be used even for recent borrowings. In theory, pronunciations with [je] can be represented by the spelling イェ (mostly used to transcribe proper nouns), although it's not clear that the use of the spelling イェ necessarily corresponds to how speakers phonetically realize the sequence. Foreign [je] may alternatively be adapted as /e/ in some cases. For some speakers, the optional, colloquial coalescence of certain other vowel sequences to [eː] can produce [jeː] in native forms, such as [hajeː] (a variant pronunciation of /hajai/ 'fast').

As discussed above, the sequences [tɕe (d)ʑe ɕe] do not occur in standard Japanese outside of foreign loanwords and a few marginal exclamations. There are no morphological alternations motivated by this gap, since no morphemes have an underlying form ending in [tɕ (d)ʑ ɕ]. In borrowed words, [tɕe] has been consistently retained at all time periods, with very few exceptions. (Note: The use of [se] instead of [tɕe] in セロ sero from cello seems to be unique. Another rare exception, showing adaptation to [tɕi] (vowel raising), is チッキ (chikki) from English check (less common than チェック (chekku)).) The sequences [(d)ʑe] and [ɕe] have usually been retained in words borrowed more recently than around 1950, whereas words borrowed before that point may show depalatalization to [(d)ze] and [se] respectively, as seen in the 19th-century borrowed forms ゼリー (zerī) from English jelly, ゼントルマン (zentoruman) from English gentleman, and セパード (sepādo) from English shepherd.

The sequences [ɸʲɯ dʲɯ tʲɯ] occur only in recent loans, such as フュージョン (fyūjon), デュエット (dyuetto), テューバ (tyūba) from fusion, duet, tuba: they can be interpreted as /fju dju tju/ in analyses where [tɕ] is not interpreted as /tj/.

==== Pre-/u/ consonants ====
Several Japanese consonants developed special phonetic values before /u/. Though originally allophonic, some of these variants have arguably attained phonemic status because of later neutralizations or the introduction of novel contrasts in loanwords.

In core vocabulary, [ɸɯ] can be analyzed as an allophonic realization of /hu/. However, in words of foreign origin, the voiceless bilabial fricative [ɸ] can occur before vowels other than /u/. This introduces a distinctive contrast between [ɸa ɸe ɸi ɸo] and [ha he çi ho]; therefore, Vance (2008) recognizes [ɸ] as a distinct consonant phoneme /f/, and interprets [ɸɯ] as phonemically /fu/, leaving */hu/ as a gap. In contrast, Watanabe (2009) prefers the analysis /hu/ and argues that /h/ in this context is distinct phonemically and sometimes phonetically from the /f/ [ɸ] found in foreign /fa fe fi fo/ (which would leave */fu/ as a gap). In any case, /h/ and /f/ do not contrast before /u/.

Outside of loanwords, [tɯ] and [dɯ] do not occur, because /t d/ were affricated to [ts dz] before /u/.

In dialects that show neutralization of the [dz z] contrast, the merged phone [(d)z] can occur before /a, e, o/ as well as before /u/. Thus, for these dialects, [(d)zɯ] can be phonemically analyzed as /zu/, leaving /du/ as a gap.

In core vocabulary, the voiceless coronal affricate [ts] occurs only before the vowel /u/; thus [tsɯ] can be analyzed as an allophonic realization of /tu/. Verb inflection shows alternations between [t] and [ts], as in [katanai] 'win' (negative) and [katsɯ] 'win' (present tense). However, the interpretation of [tsɯ] as /tu/ (with [ts] merely an allophone of /t/) is complicated by the occurrence of [ts] before vowels other than /u/ in loanwords.

In addition, unaffricated [tɯ dɯ] are sometimes used in recent loanwords. They can be represented in kana by トゥ and ドゥ, which received official recognition by a cabinet notice in 1991 as an alternative to the use of [tsɯ] [(d)zɯ] or [to] [do] to adapt foreign [tu] [du]. Forms where [tɯ] and [dɯ] can be found include the following:

English: Today → [tɯdei]
French: toujours [tuʒuʀ] → [tɯ(d)ʑɯːɾɯ]
French: douze [duz] → [dɯːzɯ]

Older loanwords from French display adaptation of [tɯ] as [tsɯ] and of [dɯ] as [do]:

French: Toulouse [tuluz] → [tsɯːɾɯːzɯ]
French: Pompidou [pɔ̃pidu] → [pompidoː]

Vance (2008) argues that [tɯ] and [dɯ] remain "foreignisms" in Japanese phonology; they are less frequent than [ti di], and this has been interpreted as evidence that a constraint against *[tɯ] remained active in Japanese phonology for longer than the constraint against *[ti].

In both old and recent loanwords, the epenthetic vowel used after word-final or pre-consonantal /t/ or /d/ is normally /o/ rather than /u/ (there is also some use of [tsɯ] and [(d)zɯ]). However, adapted forms show some fluctuation between [to do] and [tɯ dɯ] in this context, e.g. French estrade [estʀad] 'stage', in addition to being adapted as /esutoraddo/, has a variant adaptation /esuturaddu/.

=== Between moras ===
==== Special moras ====
If analyzed as phonemes, the moraic consonants /N/ and /Q/ show a number of phonotactic restrictions (although some constraints can be violated in certain contexts, or may apply only within certain layers of Japanese vocabulary).

===== /N/ =====
In general, the moraic nasal /N/ can occur between a vowel and a consonant, between vowels (where it contrasts with non-moraic nasal onsets), or at the end of a word.

In Sino-Japanese vocabulary, /N/ can occur as the second and final mora of a Sino-Japanese morpheme. It may be followed by any other consonant or vowel. However, in some contexts Sino-Japanese morpheme-final /N/ may cause changes to the start of a closely connected following morpheme:

- Within a bimorphemic Sino-Japanese word, /h/ is regularly replaced with /p/ after /N/, as shown by the different pronunciation of 輩 in 後輩, kōhai, 'one's junior' versus 先輩, senpai, 'one's senior'. This does not affect /Nh/ across word boundaries or across the juncture in the middle of a "complex compound" where the first or second element is a prosodic word composed of more than one Sino-Japanese morpheme: for example, /h/ remains unchanged in 完全敗北, kan+zen#hai+boku, 'total defeat', 新発明, shin#hatsu+mei, 'new invention', and 疑問符, gi+mon#fu, 'question mark'.
- Some words where /N/ is followed by a morpheme that starts in modern Japanese with a vowel or semivowel developed a pronunciation with a geminate nasal (/Nn/ or /Nm/) as the result of historic sound changes (see renjō). Aside from these isolated exceptions, /N/ followed by a vowel is regularly pronounced without resyllabification in Sino-Japanese compounds.
- A following /t k h s/ is sometimes changed to /d ɡ b z/; this can be interpreted as a special case of the more general sound change of rendaku.

Although usually not found at the start of a word, initial /N/ can occur in some colloquial speech forms as a result of dropping of a preceding mora. In this context, its pronunciation is invariably assimilated to the place of articulation of the following consonant:

/naN bjaku neN/ → /N bjaku neN/ [mbjakɯneɴ] 'several hundred years'
/soNna koto/ → /Nna koto/ [nnakoto] 'such thing'

Initial /N/ may also be used in some loanword forms:

[n.dʑa.me.na]~[ɴ.dʑa.me.na] 'N'Djamena (proper noun)'

(This place name has an alternative pronunciation with an epenthetic /u/ inserted before the /N/.)

===== /Q/ =====
The moraic obstruent /Q/ generally occurs only between a vowel and a consonant in the middle of a word. However, word-initial geminates may occur in casual speech as the result of elision:

/mattaku/ ('entirely; totally', an expression of exasperation) → [ttakɯ]
/usseena/ ('shut up') → [sseena]

In native Japanese vocabulary, /Q/ is found only before /p t k s/ (this includes [ts], [tɕ] and [ɕ], which can be viewed as allophones of /t/ and /s/); in other words, before voiceless obstruents other than /h/. The same generally applies to Sino-Japanese vocabulary. In these layers of vocabulary, [pp] functions as the geminate counterpart of /h/, due to the historical development of Japanese /h/ from Old Japanese [p]. For example, the native Japanese verbs 突く, tsuku, 'thrust' and 走る, hashiru, 'run' form the compound verb 突っ走る, tsuppashiru, 'run swiftly'.

Tamaoka & Makioka (2004) found that in a Japanese newspaper corpus, /Q/ was followed over 98% of the time by one of /p t k s/: however, there were also at least some cases where it was followed by /h b d ɡ z r/.

Two spectrograms of two speakers, from left to right male then female, for shaffuru (シャッフル; 'shuffle').

Two spectrograms of two speakers, from left to right male then female, for Mahha (マッハ; 'Mach').

Two spectrograms of two speakers, from left to right male then female, for beddo (ベッド; 'bed').

Two spectrograms of two speakers, from left to right male then female, for guzzu (グッズ; 'goods').

All spectrograms were drawn in Praat. The male speakers' spectrograms on the left-hand side are based on recordings from the mobile application of NHK Broadcasting Culture Research Institute (2025). The female speakers' spectrograms on the right-hand side are based on recording from the mobile application of Yamada et al. (2020).

Geminate /h/ is found only in recent loanwords (e.g. バッハ, Bahha, 'Bach' [bahha~baχχa], マッハ, Mahha, 'Mach', ゴッホ, Gohho, 'Gogh', マッヘ, mahhe, 'mache', チューリッヒ, Chūrihhi, 'Zurich'), and rarely in Sino-Japanese or mixed compounds (e.g. 十針, juhhari, 'ten stitches', 絶不調, zeffuchō, 'terrible slump').

Voiced obstruents (/b d ɡ z/) do not occur as geminates in Yamato or Sino-Japanese words. The avoidance of geminated voiced obstruents can be seen in certain morphophonological processes that produce voiceless but not voiced geminate obstruents: e.g. Yamato 突っ立つ, tsuttatsu vs. 突ん出す, tsundasu (not *tsuddasu) and Sino-Japanese 発達, hattatsu vs. 発電, hatsuden (not *hadden).

However, voiced geminate obstruents have been used in words adapted from foreign languages since the 19th century. These loanwords can even come from languages, such as English, that do not feature gemination in the first place. For example, when an English word features a coda consonant preceded by a lax vowel, it can be borrowed into Japanese with a geminate; gemination may also appear as a result of borrowing via written materials, where a word spelled with doubled letters leads to a geminated pronunciation. Because these loanwords can feature voiced geminates, Japanese now exhibits a voice distinction with geminates where it formerly did not:

スラッガー, suraggā ('slugger') vs. surakkā ('slacker')
キッド, kiddo ('kid') vs. kitto ('kit')

The most frequent geminated voiced obstruent is /Qd/, followed by /Qɡ/, /Qz/, /Qb/. In borrowed words, /d/ is the only voiced stop that is regularly adapted as a geminate when it occurs in word-final position after a lax/short vowel; gemination of /b/ and /ɡ/ in this context is sporadic.

Phonetically, voiced geminate obstruents in Japanese tend to have a 'semi-devoiced' pronunciation where phonetic voicing stops partway through the closure of the consonant. This is due to the inherent difficulty in sustaining voicing with a prolonged closure on the oral tract, which causes air pressure to build up quickly behind the closure without anywhere to escape. Voiced geminates can be devoiced for as much as 60% of their closure time after a brief period of initial voicing, and are shorter than voiceless geminates; geminated voiced stops do not lenite into fricatives. Vance (2008:108) claims /Qz/ is always realized as an affricate with a long stop closure ([d͡zːː~ɟ̟͡ʑːː]), not as a plain fricative (*[zːː~ʑːː]), while Labrune (2012:136) still notes [ɡɯ́zzɯ] for グッズ, guzzu, 'goods'. High vowels are not devoiced after phonemically voiced geminates.

In some cases, voiced geminate obstruents can optionally be replaced with the corresponding voiceless geminate phonemes:

バッド, baddo → バット, batto, 'bad'
ドッグ, doggu → ドック, dokku, 'dog'
ベッド, beddo → ベット, betto, 'bed'

Phonemic devoicing like this (which may be marked in spelling) has been argued to be conditioned by the presence of another voiced obstruent. Another example is doreddo ~ doretto 'dreadlocks'. Kawahara (2006) attributes this to a less reliable distinction between voiced and voiceless geminates compared to the same distinction in non-geminated consonants, noting that speakers may have difficulty distinguishing them due to the partial devoicing of voiced geminates and their resistance to the weakening process mentioned above, both of which can make them sound like voiceless geminates.

A small number of foreign proper names have katakana spellings that would imply a pronunciation with /Qr/, such as アッラー, arrā, 'Allah' and チェッリーニ, Cherrīni, 'Cellini'. The phonetic realization of /Qr/ in such forms varies between a lengthened sonorant sound and a sequence of a glottal stop followed by a sonorant.

Aside from loanwords, consonants that cannot normally occur after /Q/ may be geminated in certain emphatic variants of native words. Reduplicative mimetics may be used in an intensified form where the second consonant of the first portion is geminated, and this can affect consonants that otherwise do not occur as geminates, such as /r/ (as in barra-bara, 'in disorder', borro-boro, 'worn out', gurra-gura, 'shaky', karra-kara, 'dry', perra-pera, 'thin') or /j/ (as in buyyo-buyo, 'flabby'). Adjectives may take an emphatic pronunciation where the second consonant is geminated and the following vowel is lengthened, as in naggaai < nagai, 'long', karraai < karai, 'hot', kowwaai < kowai, 'dreadful'. Similarly, per Vance (2008), /Qj/ and /Qm/ can occur in emphatic pronunciations of 速い, hayai, 'fast' and 寒い, samui, 'cold' as [haʔːjai] and [saʔːmɯi]. A 2020 study of geminate production in mimetic forms found that emphatically lengthened /r/ could be pronounced either as a lengthened sonorant with uninterrupted voicing, or with some amount of laryngealization such as glottal stop insertion. Another noteworthy characteristic of emphatically lengthened consonants is the potential for a greater than two-way distinction in length.

Atypical /Q/ + consonant sequences may also arise in truncated word forms (created by blending some moras from each word in a longer phrase) and in forms produced as the outcome of word games:

カットモデル, katto moderu, 'cut model' /kaQto moderu/ → kadderu /kaQderu/ (blend)
バット, batto, 'bat' /baQto/ → tobba /toQba/ (form produced in a reversing language game)

However, there are also reversed argot forms that show replacement of /Q/ with [tsɯ] (likely by influence from its spelling with a small tsu kana) in contexts where /Q/ would be atypical: e.g. rappa 'trumpet' /raQpa/ → patsura; wappa 'brat' /waQpa/ → patsuwa; yakko 'guy' /jaQko/ → kotsuya; batto 'bat' /baQto/ → totsuba.

==== Vowel sequences and long vowels ====
Vowel sequences with no intervening consonant (VV sequences) occur in many contexts:

- Any pair of vowels can occur in sequence across morpheme boundaries, or within a morpheme in foreign words.
- The sequences /ai oi ui ie ae oe ue io ao uo/ can be found within a morpheme in indigenous or Sino-Japanese words. Youngberg (2021b) also includes /eo/, as in 夫婦, meoto, 'husband and wife', and /ia/, as in 幸せ, shiawase, 'happy'.
- Within a Sino-Japanese morpheme, the only vowel sequences that can normally be found are /ai ui/ (as sequences of non-identical vowels) or [eː oː ɯː] (as long vowels). Sino-Japanese [eː] is historically derived from /ei/ and may variably be realized phonetically as [ei] (possibly due to spelling pronunciation) rather than as the long vowel [eː].

When the first of two vowels in a VV sequence is higher than the second, there is often not a clear distinction between a pronunciation with hiatus and a pronunciation where a glide with the same frontness as the first vowel is inserted before the second: i.e., the VV sequences /ia io ua ea oa/ may sound like /ija ijo uwa eja owa/. For example, English gear has been borrowed into Japanese as ギア, gia, 'gear', but an alternative form of this word is ギヤ, giya. Per Kawahara (2003), the sequences /eo eu/ are not pronounced like *[ejo ejɯ]. The sequence /iu/ is not pronounced like *[ijɯ], but it is sometimes replaced with [jɯː]: this change is optional in loanwords. Kawahara states that the formation of a glide between /ia io ua ea oa/ may be blocked by a syntactic boundary or by some (though not all) morpheme boundaries (Kawahara suggests that apparent cases of glide formation across morpheme boundaries are best interpreted as evidence that the boundary is no longer transparent).

Many long vowels historically developed from vowel sequences by coalescence, such as /au ou eu iu/ > [oː oː joː jɯː]. In addition, some vowel sequences in contemporary Japanese may optionally undergo coalescence (fusion) to a long vowel in colloquial or casual speech.

Within words and phrases, Japanese allows long sequences of phonetic vowels without intervening consonants. Sequences of two vowels within a single word are extremely common, occurring at the end of many i-type adjectives, for example, and having three or more vowels in sequence within a word also occurs, as in あおい, aoi, 'blue/green'. In phrases, sequences with multiple o sounds are most common, due to the direct object particle を, o (which comes after a word) being realized as o and the honorific prefix お〜, o, which can occur in sequence, and may follow a word itself terminating in an o sound; these may be dropped in rapid speech. A fairly common construction exhibiting these is 「〜をお送りします」, o o-okuri-shimasu, '...humbly send...'. More extreme examples follow:

/hoː.oː.o.o.oː/ [hoː.oː.o.o.oː]	hōō o oō (鳳凰(ほうおう)を追(お)おう)	'let's chase the fenghuang'
/toː.oː.o.oː.oː/ [toː.oː.o.oː.oː]	tōō o ōō (東欧(とうおう)を覆(おお)おう)	'let's cover Eastern Europe'

=== Distribution of consonant phonemes based on word position ===
In Yamato vocabulary, certain consonant phonemes, such as /p/, /h/, /r/ and voiced obstruents, tend to be found only in certain positions in a word. None of these restrictions applies to foreign vocabulary; some do not apply to mimetic or Sino-Japanese vocabulary; and certain generalizations have exceptions even within Yamato vocabulary; nevertheless, some linguists interpret them as still playing a role in Japanese phonology, based on the model of a "stratified" lexicon where some active phonological constraints affect only certain layers of the vocabulary. The gaps in the distribution of these consonant phonemes can also be explained in terms of diachronic sound changes.

The voiced obstruents /b d ɡ z/ occur without restriction at the start of Sino-Japanese and foreign morphemes, but usually do not occur at the start of Yamato words. However, suffixes or postposed particles starting with these sounds have been in use since Old Japanese, such as the case particle ga, and morphemes that underlyingly start with a voiceless obstruent often have allomorphs that start with a voiced obstruent in the context of rendaku. In addition, word-initial /b d ɡ z/ occur frequently in the mimetic stratum of native Japanese vocabulary, where they often function as sound-symbolic variants of their voiceless counterparts /p h t k s/. Furthermore, some non-mimetic Yamato words start with voiced obstruents. In some cases, voicing seems to have had an expressive function, adding a negative or pejorative shade to a root. Initial voiced obstruents have also arisen in some Yamato words as the result of phonetic developments, such as loss of original word-initial high vowels or alteration of words that originally started with nasal consonants. Diachronically, the scarcity of word-initial voiced obstruents in native Japanese words seems to be a consequence of their origin from Proto-Japonic sequences involving a nasal phoneme followed by an obstruent phoneme, which developed to prenasalized consonants in Old Japanese.

Yamato and mimetic words almost never start with /r/. In contrast, word-initial /r/ occurs without restriction in Sino-Japanese and foreign vocabulary.

In Yamato words, /p/ occurs only after /Q/, as a word-medial geminate [pː] (for example, in 河童, kappa). In Sino-Japanese words, /p/ occurs only after /Q/ or /N/ (as in 切腹, seppuku, 北方, hoppō, 音符, onpu), alternating with /h/ in other positions. In contrast, mimetic words can contain singleton /p/, either word-initially or word-medially. Singleton /p/ also occurs freely in foreign words, such as パオズ, paozu, ペテン, peten, パーティー, pātī. The restricted distribution of /p/ is explained by historical sound changes that turned original *p into [ɸ] at the start of a word and /w/ between vowels. The glide /w/ was eventually lost before any vowel other than /a/. The labial fricative [ɸ] could be found before all vowels up through Late Middle Japanese, but was eventually debuccalized to [h] before /a, e, o/ and palatalized to [ç] before /i, j/: after these changes, [ɸ] was found only before /u/. In modern Japanese, [h, ç, ɸ] are commonly analyzed as allophones of a phoneme /h/. Therefore, original *p regularly evolved to modern Japanese /h/ at the start of a non-mimetic word, and to either /w/ or no consonant sound between vowels in the middle of a non-mimetic word. The few non-mimetic words where /p/ occurs initially include 風太郎, pūtarō, although as a personal name it is still pronounced Fūtarō.

The phoneme /h/ is rarely found in the middle of a Yamato morpheme (a small number of exceptions exist, such as afureru, 'overflow', ahiru, 'duck', yahari, 'likewise') or in the middle of a mimetic root (examples are mostly confined to mimetics that imitate "guttural" or "laryngeal" sounds, such as goho-goho, 'coughing' and ahaha, 'laughing'). In Yamato words, this gap results from the aforementioned change of original *p to /w/, rather than /h/, in intervocalic position. In mimetic words, intervocalic /w/ is also uncommon: therefore, Hamano (2000) proposes that the usual outcome of original *p in this context was /b/, which seems to be disproportionately common as the second consonant of a mimetic root. Likewise, /h/ never occurs in the middle of a Sino-Japanese morpheme.

=== Epenthetic vowels ===
Words of foreign origin are systematically adapted to Japanese phonotactics by inserting an epenthetic vowel (usually /u/) after a word-final consonant or between adjacent consonants. While /u/ is inserted after the majority of consonants, it is usual to use /o/ after [t, d] and /i/ after [tʃ, dʒ] (but usually not after [ʃ]). After /hh/ (used to adapt foreign word-final [x]) the epenthetic vowel is often /a/ or /o/, echoing the quality of the vowel before the consonant. There are some deviations from the aforementioned patterns: for example, some older borrowings such as ケーキ, kēki, 'cake' use /i/ after [k]. The use of epenthetic vowels in these contexts is an established convention when using kana to transcribe foreign words or names.

Historically, Sino-Japanese morphemes developed epenthetic vowels after most syllable-final consonants. This is usually /u/, in some cases /i/: the identity of the epenthetic vowel is largely, although not completely, predictable from the preceding consonant and vowel. It is debated whether these vowels should be regarded as having epenthetic status in the phonology of modern Japanese. The use of epenthetic vowels in Sino-Japanese forms has undergone some changes over time: for example, the descriptions of Portuguese missionaries indicate that in previous stages of the language, Sino-Japanese morphemes could end in coda [t] with no epenthetic vowel.

== Morphophonology ==
Japanese morphology is generally agglutinative rather than fusional. Nevertheless, Japanese exhibits a number of morphophonological processes that can change the shape of morphemes when they are combined in compounds, derived words, or inflected forms of verbs or adjectives. Various forms of sandhi exist; the Japanese term for sandhi generally is ren'on (連音).

=== Rendaku ===
In Japanese, sandhi is prominently exhibited in rendaku – consonant mutation of the initial consonant of a morpheme from unvoiced to voiced in some contexts when it occurs in the middle of a word. This phonetic difference is marked in the kana spelling of a word via the addition of dakuten, as in ka, ga (か／が). In cases where this combines with the yotsugana mergers, notably ji (じ／ぢ) and zu (ず／づ) in standard Japanese, the resulting spelling is morphophonemic rather than purely phonemic.

=== Yamato gemination or prenasalization ===
Certain processes, such as onbin sound changes, have acted to produce voiceless geminates in Yamato words (often across morpheme boundaries, but sometimes even within a morpheme). Gemination can arise as the result of emphasis, compounding, or verb conjugation. In this context, sequences of a moraic nasal /N/ and a voiced consonant are found in place of voiced geminate obstruents, which do not occur in native Standard Japanese words (other than marginally as emphatically lengthened variants of single voiced obstruents).

For example, adverbs built from a mimetic root and the suffix -ri may display root-internal gemination, as in nikkori (alongside nikori) from niko 'smiling'. Adverbs derived from roots with voiced medial consonants exhibit forms with a moraic nasal in place of gemination, such as shonbori from shobo 'lonely', unzari from uza 'bored, disappointed', bon'yari from boya 'vague', and funwari from fuwa 'light' (/r/ does not undergo either gemination or /N/-insertion in this context). Likewise, a moraic consonant often occurs between the emphatic prefix /ma/ and a following consonant: its allomorphs /maQ/ and /maN/ are in complementary distribution, with /maQ/ used before voiceless consonants and /maN/ used elsewhere.

Another example where either a voiceless geminate or /N/ is formed depending on the voicing of the following consonant is the derivation of reduced, i.e. contracted, compound verbs. Japanese has a type of compound verb formed by placing the stem of one verb before another. If the first verb has a stem that ends in a consonant, the vowel /i/ is usually placed between the first and second verb stem. But in some compounds, this vowel can be omitted, resulting in the final consonant of the first verb stem being placed directly before the initial consonant of the second verb stem. When this happens, the first consonant assimilates to the second, producing a voiceless geminate if the second is voiceless, and a sequence starting with /N/ if the second is a voiced obstruent or nasal (e.g. hik- 'pull' + tate- 'stand' > hikitateru~hittateru 'support', tsuk- 'stab' + das- 'put out' > tsukidasu~tsundasu 'thrust out').

In verb conjugation, the voiceless geminate /Qt/ is produced when a verb root that underlyingly ends in /r/, /t/, or /w/ is followed by a suffix starting with /t/ (namely, -te, -ta, -tari, -tara, -tatte), whereas /Nd/ is produced when a verb root that underlyingly ends in /m/, /n/, or /b/ is followed by a suffix starting with /t/. (At the end of a verb stem, /w/ descends from original *p; some generative analyses interpret this as the synchronic underlying form of the consonant.)

=== Sino-Japanese gemination ===
When the second mora of a Sino-Japanese morpheme is つ, tsu, く, ku, ち, chi or き, ki and it is followed by a voiceless consonant, this mora is sometimes replaced by the sokuon っ (whose spelling as a small つ is based on the frequent alternation of these sounds in this context), forming a geminate consonant:

- 一 (いつ itsu) + 緒 (しょ sho) = 一緒 (いっしょ, issho)
- 学 (がく gaku) + 校 (こう kō) = 学校 (がっこう, gakkō)

Sino-Japanese morphemes ending in these moras remain unchanged when followed by a voiced consonant, and are usually unchanged when followed by a vowel (but see renjō for exceptional examples of geminate formation before a vowel).

- 学 (がく, gaku) + 外 (がい, -gai) = 学外, gakugai, 'outside of school campus'
- 別 (べつ, betsu) + 宴 (えん, en) = 別宴, betsuen, 'farewell dinner'
- 学 (がく, gaku) + 位 (い, i) = 学位, gakui, 'academic degree'

Gemination can also affect Sino-Japanese morphemes that historically ended in ふ, fu and that now end in long vowels:

- 法 (hafu はふ > hō ほう) + 被 (hi ひ) = 法被 (happi はっぴ), instead of hōhi ほうひ
- 合 (kafu かふ > gō ごう) + 戦 (sen せん) = 合戦 (kassen), instead of gōsen
- 入 (nifu > nyū) + 声 (shō) = 入声 (nisshō), instead of nyūshō
- 十 (jifu > jū) + 戒 (kai) = 十戒 (jikkai) instead of jūkai

Most morphemes exhibiting this change derive from Middle Chinese morphemes ending in /t̚/, /k̚/ or /p̚/, which developed a prop vowel after them when pronounced in isolation (e.g., 日 MC */nit̚/ > Japanese /niti/ [ɲitɕi]) but were assimilated to the following consonant in compounds (e.g. 日本 MC */nit̚.pu̯ən/ > Japanese /niQ.poN/ [ɲip̚.poɴ]).

Gemination occurs regularly in words consisting of two Sino-Japanese morphemes, but tends not to occur across the major boundary of a complex compound (where one of the components is formed of more than one Sino-Japanese morpheme). However, there are some cases of gemination in this context.

The formation of a geminate also depends on the identity of the first and second consonant:

/tu/ つ, tsu	Systematically becomes っ /Q/ before any voiceless obstruent (/p~h t k s/).
/ku/ く, ku	Systematically becomes っ /Q/ before /k/. The numeral /roku/ also becomes /roQ/ before /p~h/. Otherwise, remains /ku/.
/ti/ ち, chi	May become っ /Q/ before any voiceless obstruent, but some morphemes, such as the numerals /siti/ and /hati/, do not consistently undergo this change. Only a small number of Sino-Japanese characters have a reading with /ti/ that is in common use.
/ki/ き, ki	May become っ /Q/ before /k/, but this is not systematic; many words show variation between /ki/ and /Q/. The form /seki/~/seQ/ (which occurs as a reading of various etymologically unrelated morphemes) shows a higher tendency to undergo gemination than other Sino-Japanese forms ending in /ki/.

=== Renjō ===
Sandhi also occurs much less often in renjō (連声), where, most commonly, a terminal /N/ or /Q/ on one morpheme results in /n/ (or /m/ when derived from historical m) or /t̚/ respectively being added to the start of a following morpheme beginning with a vowel or semivowel, as in ten + ō → tennō (天皇: てん + おう → てんのう). Examples:

First syllable ending with /N/

- 銀杏 (ginnan): ぎん (gin) + あん (an) → ぎんなん (ginnan)
- 観音 (kannon): くゎん (kwan) + おむ (om) → くゎんのむ (kwannom) → かんのん (kannon)
- 天皇 (tennō): てん (ten) + わう (wau) → てんなう (tennau) → てんのう (tennō)

First syllable ending with /N/ from original /m/

- 三位 (sanmi): さむ (sam) + ゐ (wi) → さむみ (sammi) → さんみ (sanmi)
- 陰陽 (onmyō): おむ (om) + やう (yau) → おむみゃう (ommyau) → おんみょう (onmyō)

First syllable ending with /Q/

- 雪隠 (setchin): せつ (setsu) + いん (in) → せっちん (setchin)
- 屈惑 (kuttaku): くつ (kutsu) + わく (waku) → くったく (kuttaku)

=== Vowel fusion ===
Spelling changes
Archaic	Modern
あ＋う (a + u) あ＋ふ (a + fu)	おう (ō)
い＋う (i + u) い＋ふ (i + fu)	ゆう (yū)^{1}
う＋ふ (u + fu)	うう (ū)
え＋う (e + u) え＋ふ (e + fu)	よう (yō)
お＋ふ (o + fu)	おう (ō)
お＋ほ (o + ho) お＋を (o + wo)	おお (ō)
auxiliary verb む (mu)	ん (n)
medial or final は (ha)	わ (wa)
medial or final ひ (hi), へ (he), ほ (ho)	い (i), え (e), お (o) (via wi, we, wo, see below)
any ゐ (wi), ゑ (we), を (wo)	い (i), え (e), お (o)^{1}

1. usually not reflected in spelling

During Late Middle Japanese, multiple vowel changes took place. Notably, the vowel /u/ tended to fuse with another vowel that preceded it, creating a long vowel. These vowel fusions are not reflected in historical kana usage, particularly that for classical Japanese.

- ou → oː
- au → ɔː → oː
- jeu → joː
- iu → juː

These historical changes are still germane to modern grammatical analysis and education. For example, the "volitional/tentative" auxiliary u (う) (historically mu (む)) notably fused with the last vowel of a mizenkei (未然形) (see Japanese conjugation#Verb bases):

- godan (五段):
  - kaka + mu → kakamu → kakau → kakɔː → kakoː（書かむ → 書かう → 書こう）
  - ʷaɾapa + mu → ʷaɾapamu → ʷaɾaɸamu → ʷaɾaʷau → ʷaɾaʷɔː → ʷaɾaʷoː → ʷaɾaoː（笑はむ → 笑わう → 笑おう）
- ichidan (一段):
  - je + mu → jemu → jeu → joː → ejoː（得(え)む → 得(え)う → 得(よ)う → 得(え)よう）
  - mi + mu → mimu → miu → mjuː → mijoː（見(み)む → 見(み)う → 見(みゅ)う → 見(み)よう）
- sa-hen (サ変):
  - sje + mu → sjemu → sjeu → sjoː → sijoː（せむ → せう → しょう → しよう）
- The ra-hen (ラ変) verb ari/aru (あり・ある) and its derivations:
  - aɾa + mu → aɾamu → aɾau → aɾɔː → aɾoː（あらむ → あらう → あろう）
  - naɾa + mu → naɾamu → naɾau → naɾɔː → naɾoː（ならむ → ならう → なろう）
  - daɾa + mu → daɾamu → daɾau → daɾɔː → daɾoː（だらむ → だらう → だろう）
  - taɾa + mu → taɾamu → taɾau → taɾɔː → taɾoː（たらむ → たらう → たろう）
  - nakaɾa + mu → nakaɾamu → nakaɾau → nakaɾɔː → nakaɾoː（なからむ → なからう → なかろう）
- Other jodōshi (助動詞):
  - desje + mu → desjemu → desjeu → desjoː（でせむ → でせう → でしょう）
  - masje + mu → masjemu → masjeu → masjoː（ませむ → ませう → ましょう）

Thus, while the mizenkei is listed in inflection tables, a combination of it and the auxiliary u, dubbed "volitional form" (意志形, ishikei) or "tentative form" (推量形, suiryōkei), (Note: In modern Japanese, the tentative use ("probably; I guess") is reserved for darō (だろう) and deshō (でしょう). Elsewhere, u only retains the volitional use ("let's; shall we?").) must still be learnt separately. Furthermore, results of the above fusions caused some mizenkei to disappear entirely. Dictionaries and grammar guides no longer list たら, だら, でせ and なから as, respectively, the mizenkei of た, だ, です and ない. Instead, たろ, だろ, でしょ and なかろ are perfunctorily used. This perfunctory listing may also extend to godan verbs as well, for example 書く may have "two" mizenkei, 書か and 書こ, so that it has enough vowels to justify the term godan (see Japanese godan and ichidan verbs#Godan vs yodan).

In contemporary Japanese, sequences such as /ae, ai, oi/ can fuse into [eː ~ ɛː] in masculine speech. This particular fusion is associated with non-Tokyo dialects, as well as Tokyo's male and/or delinquent sociolects. Some examples include nai → nē (ない → ねえ; negative auxiliary adjective), tai → tē (たい → てえ; desiderative auxiliary adjective), semai → semē (狭い → 狭え; 'narrow'), sugoi → sugē (凄い → 凄え; 'terrible/very bad; terrific/very good') (as well as most adjectives ending in ai and oi), omae → omē (お前; 'you'), atari mae → atari mē (当たり前; 'of course'), etc. This fusion does not straddle word boundaries, hence does not occur in ore ga iku (俺が行く; 'I'll go') or ore mo iku (俺も行く; 'I'll go, too'). It is also lexically restrictive and does not occur in such words as koitsu (こいつ; 'this guy'), kiiroi (黄色い; 'yellow'), saigo (最後; 'last'), kimae (気前; 'generosity'), etc. The glides [j, β̞] are said to not occur before /e/ in contemporary native Japanese (excluding recent loanwords), yet they may still be heard in hayai → haē (早い → 早え; [hɑ̈jɑ̈́i → hɑ̈jé̞ː], 'quick') and kowai → koē (怖い → 怖え; [ko̞β̞ɑ̈́i → ko̞β̞é̞ː], 'scary'). At least some speakers are cognizant enough of this that they can spell 怖え in kana as kowē (コウェー). yoi (良い; 'good') has some variants, ii ~ ī, ei and ē. The same dialects and sociolects also have ui become ī, as in warui → warī (悪い; 'bad'). The sequences /oi/ and /ui/ undergo fusion only in adjective forms.

=== Onbin ===
Another prominent feature is onbin (音便; euphonic sound change). This refers to various historical sound changes that can be loosely described as showing reduction, lenition or coalescence. Alternations resulting from onbin continue to be seen in some areas of Japanese morphology, such as the conjugation of certain verb forms or the form of certain compound verbs.

In some cases, onbin changes occurred within a morpheme, as in hōki (箒 (ほうき); broom), which underwent two sound changes from earlier hahaki (ははき) → hauki (はうき) (onbin) → houki (ほうき) (historical vowel change) → hōki (ほうき) (long vowel, sound change not reflected in kana spelling).

One type of onbin caused certain onset consonants to be deleted, mainly before /i/ or /u/, which created vowel sequences, or long vowels by coalescence of /u/ with the preceding vowel.

Another type of onbin resulted in the development of moraic consonants /Q/ or /N/ in certain circumstances in native Japanese words.

==== Types ====
Types of onbin are named after their resulting mora. If the resulting mora is /i/, the onbin is called i-onbin (イ音便); if /u/, u-onbin (ウ音便); if /Q/ (促音, sokuon), sokuonbin (促音便); and if /N/ (撥音, hatsuon), hatsuonbin (撥音便).

Historically, sokuonbin was triggered in verb conjugation when any of the morae /ti, ɾi, si, pi/ in a ren'yōkei (連体形) (see Japanese conjugation#Verb bases) was followed by the consonant /t/ (for example in the auxiliary ta (た) or the particle te (て)). In such an environment, the high vowel /i/ was reduced, and the remaining consonant eventually assimilated with /t/:

- toɾi + te → toɾite → toɾte → totte（取って）
- kapi + te → kapite → kaɸite → kaʷite → kaʷte → katte（買って）
- ipi + te → ipite → iɸite → iʷite → iʷte → itte（言って）

Grammatical sokuonbin is found predominantly in eastern dialects (including the standard Tokyo dialect taught to foreigners), while western ones (including the Kansai dialect) favor u-onbin triggered by the historical mora /pi/:

- kapi + te → kapite → kaɸite → kaʷite → kaute → kɔːte → koːte（買うて）
- ipi + te → ipite → iɸite → iʷite → iute → juːte（言うて）

On the other hand, hatsuonbin was triggered when any of the morae /mi, bi, ni/ in a ren'yōkei was followed by the consonant /t/. Similar vowel reduction and consonant assimilation occurred:

- pumi + te → pumite → pumute → punde → ɸunde（踏んで）
- jobi + te → jobite → jomute → jonde（呼んで）
- sini + te → sinite → sinde（死んで）

In general, onbin can occur in the following historical environments:

- i-onbin:
  - When a ren'yōkei with the mora /ki/, /ɡi/, or rarely /si/, was followed by /t/:
    - kaki + te → kakite → kaite（書いて）
    - ojoɡi + te → ojoɡite → ojoide（泳いで）
    - sasi + te → sasite → saite（指いて）
  - When the ren'yōkei of the verb yuku (行く; "to go") was followed by /t/: (Note: Compare iku (行く; "to go") below which undergoes sokuonbin.)
    - juki + te → jukite → juite（行いて）
  - When the mora /ɾi/ in ren'yōkei and meireikei (命令形) lost the consonant /ɾ/ in certain honorific verbs:
    - ossjaɾi → ossjai（仰い）
  - When the historical rentaikei (連体形) of an adjective lost the consonant /k/. This particular type of i-onbin resulted in what is now known to foreign learners as "-i adjectives":
    - atuki → atui（熱い）
    - utukusiki → utukusii（美しい）
  - In certain verbs:
    - tate + maturu → tatematuru → taimaturu（奉(たいまつ)る）
  - In certain nouns:
    - kisaki → kisai（后(きさい)）
- u-onbin:
  - When a ren'yōkei with the mora /pi/, /bi/ or /mi/ was followed by /t/:
    - omopi + te → omopite → omoute → omoːte（思うて）
    - jobi + te → jobite → joude → joːde（呼うで）
    - jami + te → yamite → jaude → jɔːde → joːde（病うで）
    - tanomi + taru → tanomitaru → tanoudaru → tanoːdaru（頼うだる）
  - When the ren'yōkei of the verbs tou (問う; "to ask") and kou (請う; "to request") were followed by /t/, even in eastern dialects:
    - topi + te → topite → toute → toːte（問うて）
    - kopi + te → kopite → koute → koːte（請うて）
  - When the mizenkei (未然形) of an adjective lost the consonant /k/:
    - joku → jou → joː（良う）
    - aɾiɡataku → aɾiɡatau → aɾiɡatɔː → aɾiɡatoː（有り難う）
    - pajaku → pajaku → ɸajau → hajɔː → hajoː（早う）
    - utukusiku → utukusiu → utukusjuː（美しゅう）
  - In certain nouns:
    - ʷo + pito → ʷopito → ʷouto → oːto（夫(おうと)）
    - opi + te → opite → opute → oute → oːte（追手(おうて)）
    - oto + pito → otopito → otouto → otoːto（弟(おとうと)）and in many other compounds of Old Japanese pi₁to₂
    - kaɡapuɾi → kaubuɾi → kɔːbuɾi → koːbuɾi（冠(こうぶり)）
  - In the verb yuu (言う) (Note: When spelt in hiragana, it is still いう, not *ゆう. This convention, along with the particles wa (は), e (へ) and o (を), is retained from historical kana orthography for practical purposes. For yuu (言う), the kana spelling (いう) is in keeping with other conjugational forms such as iwanai (いわない) and itta (いった). yuu (言(い)う; 'say') is possibly homophonous with yuu (結(ゆ)う; 'tie (hair)'), except that the latter can be unaccented or accented, while the former is only unaccented.)
    - ipu → iɸu → iu → juː（言う）
- Sokuonbin:
  - When a ren'yōkei with the mora /ti/, /ɾi/ or /pi/ was followed by /t/:
    - kati + te → katite → katte（勝って）
    - aɾi + te → aɾite → atte（有って）
    - kupi + te → kupite → kutte（食って）
  - When the ren'yōkei of the verb iku (行く; "to go") was followed by /t/: (Note: Compare yuku (行く; "to go") above which undergoes i-onbin. Early Christian (キリシタン, Kirishitan) writings recorded the i-onbin form /iite/ as well.)
    - iki + te → ikite → iite → itte（行って）
  - In certain nouns:
    - ʷo + pito → ʷopito → ʷotto → otto（夫(おっと)）
    - opi + te → opite → otte（追っ手）
    - sau + soku → sausoku → sassoku（早速(さっそく)）
    - japaɾi → jappaɾi（矢っ張り）
    - ma + siɾo → masiɾo → massiɾo（真っ白）
- Hatsuonbin:
  - When a ren'yōkei with the mora /mi/, /bi/ or /ni/ was followed by /t/:
    - jomi + te → jomite → jonde（読んで）
    - tobi + te → tobite → tonde（飛んで）
    - sini + te → sinite → sinde（死んで）
  - In certain expressions formed with the particles ni (に) and no (の):
    - sakaɾi + ni → sakaɾini → sakanni（盛んに）
    - nokoɾi + no + juki → nokoɾinojuki → nokonnojuki（残んの雪）
  - In certain nouns:
    - kami + na + tuki → kaminaduki → kannaduki → kannazuki（神無月(かんなづき)）
    - kami + sasi → kamisasi → kanzasi（簪(かんざし)）
    - ma + naka → manaka → mannaka（真ん中）

==== Polite adjective forms ====
The polite adjective forms (used before the polite copula gozaru (ござる; be) and verb zonjiru (存じる; think, know)) exhibit a one-step or two-step sound change. Firstly, these use the continuative form, -ku (-く), which exhibits onbin, dropping the k as -ku (-く) → -u (-う). Secondly, the vowel may combine with the preceding vowel, according to historical sound changes; if the resulting new sound is palatalized, meaning yu, yo (ゆ、よ), this combines with the preceding consonant, yielding a palatalized syllable.

This is most prominent in certain everyday terms that derive from an i-adjective ending in -ai changing to -ō (-ou), which is because these terms are abbreviations of polite phrases ending in gozaimasu, sometimes with a polite o- prefix. The terms are also used in their full form, with notable examples being:

- arigatō (有り難う、ありがとう; Thank you), from arigatai (有り難い、ありがたい; (I am) grateful).
- ohayō (お早う、おはよう; Good morning), from hayai (早い、はやい; (It is) early).
- omedetō (お目出度う、おめでとう; Congratulations), from medetai (目出度い、めでたい; (It is) auspicious).

Other forms like this are found in polite speech, such as oishiku (美味しく) → oishū (美味しゅう) and ōkiku (大きく) → ōkyū (大きゅう).

== Earlier domestic phonology ==
Descriptions of Japanese phonology during the late Edo period and Meiji era were based on fanqie, a method of analyzing Middle Chinese syllables into an initial (that is, an onset consonant) and a final (a rhyme). For example, the word 東 [tuŋ] can be analyzed as containing the initial [t] represented by the word 德 [tək] which shares such initial, and the final [uŋ] represented by the word 紅 [ɣuŋ] which shares such final. The characters 德, 紅 and 東 are respectively known in Chinese as the "upper character" (上字), the "lower character" (下字) and the "return character" (歸字). However, in Japanese, they were also called the "father character" (父字, chichiji), the "mother character" (母字, hahaji) and the "child character" (子字, koji). (Note: Hepburn (1872:37) translates "Consonant" to "Shi-in, ko ji.") The methods and terminology of Middle Chinese phonology were implemented in Japanese phonology, where it was said that a "father sound" (父音, fuin, fuon) (Note: In Japanese phonology, an onset consonant. In foreign phonology, a consonant.) combined with a "mother sound" (母音, boin, boon) (Note: A vowel.) to make a "child sound" (子音, shiin, shion). (Note: In Japanese phonology, a mora spelt with a kana in the gojūon, except a, i, u, e, o (あいうえお) which are boon (母音). In foreign phonology, a consonant.) For example, the "child sound" /ka/ (カ, ka) can be analyzed as containing the "father sound" /k/ (ク, ku) and the "mother sound" /a/ (ア, a). Other concepts borrowed from Chinese phonology included:

- "Clear sound" (清音, seion): In Chinese phonology, a voiceless consonant (see w:zh:清濁音). In Japanese phonology, either a boon (母音) or a shion (子音), which is not spelt with the dakuten or the handakuten.
- "Muddy sound" (濁音, dakuon): In Chinese phonology, a voiced consonant (see w:zh:清濁音). In Japanese phonology, a mora spelt with the dakuten.
- "Partly clear sound" (次清音, jiseion): In Chinese phonology, a voiceless aspirated consonant (see w:zh:清濁音). In Japanese phonology, a mora spelt with the handakuten.
- "Rushed sound" (促音, sokuon): In Chinese phonology, a checked syllable. In Japanese phonology, a moraic obstruent.
- "Open sound" (開音, kaion): In Chinese phonology, a syllable that does not contain the bilabial onglide /w/ (see w:zh:開合). In Japanese phonology, a mora that does not contain the bilabial onglide; or a mora that contains the vowel /a/; or a mora that contains the long open-mid vowel /ɔː/ in Late Middle Japanese.
- "Closed sound" (合音, gōon): In Chinese phonology, a syllable whose rhyme contains the bilabial onglide /w/ (see w:zh:開合). In Japanese phonology, a mora that contains the bilabial onglide; or a mora that contains one of the vowels /i, e, o, u/; or a mora that contains the long close-mid vowel /oː/ in Late Middle Japanese.

== See also ==
- Gemination § Japanese
- Japanese grammar
- Japanese writing system
- Japanese honorifics
- Japanese language and computers
- Japanese language education
- Japanese literature
- Transcription into Japanese
- Yotsugana, the different distinctions of historical *zi, *di, *zu, *du in different regions of Japan
- Okinawan Japanese, a variant of Standard Japanese influenced by the Ryukyuan languages

== Bibliography ==
- Akamatsu, Tsutomu (1997). Japanese Phonetics: Theory and Practice. Munich: Lincom Europa. ISBN 3-89586-095-6.
- Aoyama, Katsura (2001), A Psycholinguistic Perspective on Finnish and Japanese Prosody: Perception, Production and Child Acquisition of Consonantal Quantity Distinctions, Springer Science & Business Media, ISBN 978-0-7923-7216-5
- Arai, Takayuki; Warner, Natasha; Greenberg, Steven (2007), "Analysis of spontaneous Japanese in a multi-language telephone-speech corpus", Acoustical Science and Technology, 28 (1): 46–48, doi:10.1250/ast.28.46
- Bloch, Bernard (1950). "Studies in Colloquial Japanese IV: Phonemics". Language. 26 (1). Linguistic Society of America: 86–125. doi:10.2307/410409. JSTOR 410409.
- Broselow, Ellen; Huffman, Marie; Hwang, Jiwon; Kao, Sophia; Lu, Yu-An (2012), "Emergent Rankings in Foreign Word Adaptations", in Arnett, Nathan; Bennett, Ryan (eds.), Proceedings of the 30th West Coast Conference on Formal Linguistics, pp. 98–108
- Cao, Mengxue; Li, Aijun; Fang, Qiang; Wei, Jianguo; Song, Chan; Dang, Jianwu (2012). Acoustic and articulatory analysis on Japanese vowels in emotional speech. 2012 8th International Symposium on Chinese Spoken Language Processing. Hong Kong, China: Institute of Electrical and Electronics Engineers. doi:10.1109/ISCSLP.2012.6423516.
- Crawford, Clifford James (2009), Adaptation and Transmission in Japanese Loanword Phonology (PhD thesis)
- Frellesvig, Bjarke (2010). A History of the Japanese Language. Cambridge: Cambridge University Press. ISBN 978-0-521-65320-6.
- Fujimoto, Masako (2015), "Vowel devoicing", in Kubozono, Haruo (ed.), Handbook of Japanese Phonetics and Phonology, Berlin: De Gruyter, pp. 167–214, doi:10.1515/9781614511984.167, ISBN 978-1-61451-252-3
- Fujimoto, Masako; Maekawa, Kikuo; Funatsu, Seiya (2010), "Laryngeal Characteristics during the Production of Geminate Consonants", Proceedings of Interspeech 2010: 925–928, doi:10.21437/Interspeech.2010-313
- Gao, Jiayin; Arai, Takayuki (2019), "Plosive (de-)voicing and f0 perturbations in Tokyo Japanese: Positional variation, cue enhancement, and contrast recovery." (PDF), Journal of Phonetics, 77 100932, doi:10.1016/j.wocn.2019.100932
- Hall, Kathleen Currie (2013), "Documenting phonological change: A comparison of two Japanese phonemic splits" ( (PDF)), in Luo, Shan (ed.), Proceedings of the 2013 Annual Conference of the Canadian Linguistic Association, archived from the original on 2019-12-12
- Hamano, Shoko (2000), "Voicing of Obstruents in Old Japanese: Evidence from the Sound-Symbolic Stratum", Journal of East Asian Linguistics, 9 (3): 207–225, doi:10.1023/A:1008367619295
- Hasegawa, Nobuko (1979). "Casual Speech vs. Fast Speech" (PDF). Papers from the Fifteenth Regional Meeting of the Chicago Linguistic Society: 126–137.
- Hashi, Michiko; Komada, Akina; Miura, Takao; Daimon, Shotaro; Takakura, Yuhki; Hayashi, Ryoko (2014), "Articulatory Variability in Word-Final Japanese Moraic-Nasals: An X-ray Microbeam Study", Journal of the Phonetic Society of Japan, 18 (2): 95–105, doi:10.24467/onseikenkyu.20.1_77
- Hattori, Shiro (1950), "Phoneme, Phone, and Compound Phone", Gengo Kenkyu: Journal of the Linguistic Society of Japan, 1950 (16): 92–108, 163, doi:10.11435/gengo1939.1950.16_92
- Hattori, Shiro (1984), Onseigaku 音声学 [Phonetics] (in Japanese), Iwanami Shoten
- Hepburn, James Curtis, ed. (1872), "Part Second: English and Japanese Dictionary", A Japanese-English and English-Japanese Dictionary (2nd ed.), Shanghai: American Presbyterian Mission Press
- Hirayama, Manami (2009), Postlexical Prosodic Structure and Vowel Devoicing in Japanese (PhD thesis), University of Toronto
- Homma, Yayoi (1980), "Voice onset time in Japanese stops", Onsei Gakkai Kaihō 音声学会会報 [The Bulletin of the Phonetic Society of Japan], 163: 7–9
- Homma, Yayoi (1981), "Durational relationships between Japanese stops and vowels.", Journal of Phonetics, 9 (3): 273–281, doi:10.1016/S0095-4470(19)30971-4
- Idemaru, Kaori; Guion, Susan G. (2008), "Acoustic covariants of length contrast in Japanese stops", Journal of the International Phonetic Association, 38 (2): 167–186, doi:10.1017/S0025100308003459
- Irwin, Mark (2008). "Homomorphemic Diffusion in Japanese Nonce Lexemes". Japanese Language and Literature. 42 (1): 45–61. JSTOR 30198054.
- Irwin, Mark (2011), Loanwords in Japanese, John Benjamins, ISBN 978-90-2720592-6
- Itō, Junko; Kitagawa, Yoshihisa; Mester, R. Armin (1996), "Prosodic Faithfulness and Correspondence: Evidence from a Japanese Argot", Journal of East Asian Linguistics, 5 (3): 217–294, doi:10.1007/BF00132604
- Itō, Junko; Kubozono, Haruo; Mester, R. Armin (2017), "A prosodic account of consonant gemination in Japanese loanwords", in Kubozono, Haruo (ed.), The Phonetics and Phonology of Geminate Consonants, Oxford University Press, pp. 283–320
- Itō, Junko; Mester, R. Armin (1995), "Japanese phonology", in Goldsmith, John A (ed.), The Handbook of Phonological Theory, Blackwell Handbooks in Linguistics, Blackwell Publishers, pp. 817–838
- Itō, Junko; Mester, R. Armin (1996), "Stem and word in Sino-Japanese", Phonological Structure and Language Processing: Cross-Linguistic Studies, pp. 13–44, doi:10.1515/9783110815825.13, ISBN 978-3-11-081582-5
- Itō, Junko; Mester, R. Armin (2013). "Junko Itō, Armin Mester (UC Santa Cruz): Supersized Units". youtube.com. MIT Department of Linguistics and Philosophy.
- Itō, Junko; Mester, R. Armin (2015a), "Sino-Japanese phonology", in Kubozono, Haruo (ed.), Handbook of Japanese Phonetics and Phonology, Berlin: De Gruyter, pp. 253–288
- Itō, Junko; Mester, R. Armin (2015b), "Word formation and phonological processes", in Kubozono, Haruo (ed.), Handbook of Japanese Phonetics and Phonology, Berlin: De Gruyter, pp. 363–395
- Itō, Junko; Mester, R. Armin (2018), "Tonal alignment and preaccentuation", Journal of Japanese Linguistics, 34 (2): 195–222, doi:10.1515/jjl-2018-0014
- Itō, Junko; Mester, R. Armin; Padgett, Jaye (2001), "Alternations and Distributional Patterns in Japanese Phonology", Onsei kenkyū 音声研究 [Journal of the Phonetic Society of Japan], 5 (2): 54–60
- Katayama, Motoko (1998), Loanword phonology in Japanese and optimality theory (dissertation), Santa Cruz: University of California, Santa Cruz
- Kawahara, Shigeto (2003), Phonological Society of Japan (ed.), "On a Certain Type of Hiatus Resolution in Japanese" (PDF), On'in Kenkyuu 音韻研究 [Phonological Studies], 6: 11–20
- Kawahara, Shigeto (2006), "A faithfulness ranking projected from a perceptibility scale: The case of [+voice] in Japanese", Language, 82 (3): 536–574, doi:10.1353/lan.2006.0146, S2CID 145093954
- Kawahara, Shigeto (2011), Japanese loanword devoicing revisited: A rating study
- Kawahara, Shigeto (2015), "The phonetics of sokuon, or geminate obstruents", in Kubozono, Haruo (ed.), Handbook of Japanese Phonetics and Phonology, Berlin: De Gruyter, pp. 43–77
- Kawahara, Shigeto; Shaw, Jason (2018), "Persistence of prosody", Hana-bana (花々): A Festschrift for Junko Itō and Armin Mester, UC Santa Cruz: Festschrifts
- Kilbourn-Ceron, Oriana; Sonderegger, Morgan (2017), "Boundary phenomena and variability in Japanese high vowel devoicing", Nat Lang Linguist Theory, 36: 175–217, doi:10.1007/s11049-017-9368-x
- Kindaichi, Haruhiko; Akinaga, Kazue, eds. (1 April 2025) [10 April 2014]. 新明解日本語アクセント辞典 (in Japanese) (2nd ed.). Chiyoda, Tokyo: Sanseido. ISBN 978-4-385-13468-0.
- Kitaoka, Daiho (2017), "Repair Strategies for failed feature specification in Japanese: Evidence from loanwords, a reversing word game, and blending.", Proceedings of the Annual Meetings on Phonology, 4, doi:10.3765/amp.v4i0.3978
- Kitagawa, Yoshihisa; Albin, Aaron Lee (2023), "On the interaction of fortition, lenition and Rendaku voicing in Japanese — Experimental and diachronic insights", IULC Working Papers, 23 (1), Indiana University Linguistics Club Working Papers
- Kochetov, Alexei (2014), "Voicing and Tongue-Palate Contact Differences in Japanese Obstruents", Journal of the Phonetic Society of Japan, 18 (2): 63–76, doi:10.24467/onseikenkyu.18.2_63
- Kochetov, Alexei (2018), "Linguopalatal contact contrasts in the production of Japanese consonants: Electropalatographic data from five speakers", Acoustical Science and Technology, 39 (2), The Acoustical Society of Japan: 84–91, doi:10.1250/ast.39.84
- Kondo, Mariko (1997), Mechanisms of Vowel Devoicing in Japanese (PhD thesis), University of Edinburgh
- Kubozono, Haruo; Itō, Junko; Mester, R. Armin (2009), The Linguistic Society of Korea (ed.), "Consonant Gemination in Japanese Loanword Phonology", Current Issues in Unity and Diversity of Languages. Collection of Papers Selected from the 18th International Congress of Linguists, Republic of Korea: Dongam Publishing Co.
- Kubozono, Haruo (2015a), "Introduction to Japanese phonetics and phonology", in Kubozono, Haruo (ed.), Handbook of Japanese Phonetics and Phonology, Berlin: De Gruyter, pp. 1–40, doi:10.1515/9781614511984.1, ISBN 978-1-61451-252-3
- Kubozono, Haruo (2015b), "Diphthongs and vowel coalescence", in Kubozono, Haruo (ed.), Handbook of Japanese Phonetics and Phonology, Berlin: De Gruyter, pp. 215–249, doi:10.1515/9781614511984.1, ISBN 978-1-61451-252-3
- Kubozono, Haruo (2015c), "Loanword phonology", in Kubozono, Haruo (ed.), Handbook of Japanese Phonetics and Phonology, Berlin: De Gruyter, pp. 313–361, doi:10.1515/9781614511984.1, ISBN 978-1-61451-252-3
- Labrune, Laurence (2012). The Phonology of Japanese. Oxford; New York: Oxford University Press. ISBN 978-0-19-9545834.
- Ladefoged, Peter; Maddieson, Ian (1996), "Glottal closure", The Sounds of the World's Languages, Blackwell Publishers, ISBN 0-631-19815-6
- Lawrence, Wayne P. (1999), "Ha-gyōon no mae no sokuon - gendaigo ni okeru /Qh/" ハ行音の前の促音:現代語における/Qh/ [Gemination before ha-row sounds: /Qh/ in contemporary Japanese], Kokugogaku 国語学 [Japanese philology] (in Japanese), 199: 16–27
- Lawrence, Wayne (2001), "The phonology of Zehhutyou: A prefix is born", Imi to katachi no intāfeisu 意味と形のインターフェイス [The Interface of Meaning and Form: A Collection of Essays in Commemoration of the 60th Birthday of Professor Minoru Nakaumi], Tokyo: Kurosio Publishers (くろしお出版), pp. 967–977
- Lawrence, Wayne P. (2004), "High Vowels, Glides, and Japanese Phonology", Gengo Kenkyu 言語研究, 125: 1–30
- Li, Teng; Honda, Kiyoshi; Wei, Jianguo; Dang, Jianwu (2015), A lip protrusion mechanism examined by magnetic resonance imaging and finite element modeling. (PDF)
- Maddieson, Ian (2005), "Bilabial and Labio-dental Fricatives in Ewe", UC Berkeley PhonLab Annual Report, 1 (1): 199–215, doi:10.5070/P74r49g6qx
- Maekawa, Kikuo (1993), "Boin no museika" 母音の無声化 [Vowel devoicing], Kōza nihongo to nihongo kyōiku (2) Nihongo no onsei - on'in (1) 講座日本語と日本語教育（2）日本語の音声・音韻（上） [Lectures on Japanese Language and Japanese Language Education (2) Japanese Phonetics and Phonology (Part 1)], Tokyo: Meiji Shoin, pp. 135–153
- Maekawa, Kikuo (2010), "Coarticulatory reinterpretation of allophonic variation: Corpus-based analysis of /z/ in spontaneous Japanese", Journal of Phonetics, 38 (3): 360–374, doi:10.1016/j.wocn.2010.03.001
- Maekawa, Kikuo (2018) [2010], "Weakening of Stop Articulation in Japanese Voiced Plosives", Journal of the Phonetic Society of Japan, 22 (1): 21–34, doi:10.24467/onseikenkyu.22.1_21
- Maekawa, Kikuo (2020), "Remarks on Japanese /w/", ICU Working Papers in Linguistics, 10: 45–52, doi:10.34577/00004625
- Maekawa, Kikuo (2023), "Production of the utterance-final moraic nasal in Japanese: A real-time MRI study", Journal of the International Phonetic Association, 53 (1): 189–212, doi:10.1017/S0025100321000050
- Maekawa, Kikuo; Kikuchi, Hideaki (2005), "Corpus-based analysis of vowel devoicing in spontaneous Japanese: an interim report.", in van de Weijer, Jeroen Maarten; Nanjo, Kensuke; Nishihara, Tetsuo (eds.), Voicing in Japanese, Berlin and New York: Mouton de Gruyter, pp. 205–228
- Martin, Samuel Elmo (1952), "Morphophonemics of Standard Colloquial Japanese", Language, 28 (3): 7–115, doi:10.2307/522176, JSTOR 522176
- Martin, Samuel Elmo (2004) [1975]. A Reference Grammar of Japanese (revised ed.). Honolulu: University of Hawai'i Press. ISBN 0-8248-2818-6.
- Mester, R. Armin; Itō, Junko (1989), "Feature Predictability and Underspecification: Palatal Prosody in Japanese Mimetics", Language, 65 (2), Linguistic Society of America: 258–293, doi:10.2307/415333, JSTOR 415333
- Mizoguchi, Ai (2019), Articulation of the Japanese Moraic Nasal: Place of Articulation, Assimilation, and L2 Transfer (PhD thesis), City University of New York
- Morimoto, Maho (2020), Geminated Liquids in Japanese: A production study (PhD thesis), UC Santa Cruz
- Murano, Emi Z.; Stone, Maureen; Honda, Kiyoshi (2005), "Muscular hydrostat mechanism for lip protrusion in speech", The Journal of the Acoustical Society of America, 118 (3_Supplement): 2023, Bibcode:2005ASAJ..118.2023M, doi:10.1121/1.4785760
- Nasu, Akio (2015), "The phonological lexicon and mimetic phonology", in Kubozono, Haruo (ed.), Handbook of Japanese Phonetics and Phonology, Berlin: De Gruyter, pp. 253–288
- Nasukawa, Kuniya (2015), "8. Why the Palatal Glide Is Not a Consonant in Japanese: A Dependency-based Analysis", in Raimy, Eric; Cairns, Charles E. (eds.), The Segment in Phonetics and Phonology, Wiley Blackwell, pp. 180–198
- National Language Research Institute (1990), Nihongo no boin, shiin, onsetsu: Chōon undō no jikken onseigaku-teki kenkyū 日本語の母音，子音，音節: 調音運動の実験音声学的研究 [Japanese vowels, consonants, syllables: Experimental phonetics research of articulatory movements] (in Japanese), Tokyo: National Language Research Institute, doi:10.15084/00001212
- NHK Broadcasting Culture Research Institute, ed. (20 June 2025) [25 May 2016]. NHK日本語発音アクセント新辞典 (in Japanese) (15th ed.). Shibuya, Tokyo: NHK Publishing. ISBN 978-4-14-011345-5.
- Nogita, Akitsugu (2010), Examination of the [si] and [ʃi] Confusion by Japanese ESL Learners (Master of Arts thesis), University of Victoria
- Nogita, Akitsugu (2016). "Arguments that Japanese [Cj]s are complex onsets: durations of Japanese [Cj]s and Russian [Cj]s and blocking of Japanese vowel devoicing". Working Papers of the Linguistics Circle of the University of Victoria. 26 (1): 73–99.
- Nogita, Akitsugu; Yamane, Noriko (2015), "Japanese moraic dorsalized nasal stop" (PDF), Phonological Studies, 18: 75–84, archived from the original (PDF) on 2019-08-19
- Nogita, Akitsugu; Yamane, Noriko (2019), "Redefining Roundness, Protrusion and Compression: In the Case of Tokyo Japanese /u/", Phonological Studies, 22, Phonological Society of Japan: 59–66
- Ohta, Satoshi (1991), "Syllable and Mora Geometry in Japanese", Tsukuba English Studies, 10: 157–181
- Okada, Hideo (1999), "Japanese", in International Phonetic Association (ed.), Handbook of the International Phonetic Association: A Guide to the Use of the International Phonetic Alphabet, Cambridge University Press, pp. 117–119, ISBN 978-0-52163751-0
- Otake, Takashi (2015), "Mora and mora-timing", in Kubozono, Haruo (ed.), Handbook of Japanese Phonetics and Phonology, Berlin: De Gruyter, pp. 493–523
- Pintér, Gábor (2015), "The emergence of new consonant contrasts", in Kubozono, Haruo (ed.), Handbook of Japanese Phonetics and Phonology, Berlin: De Gruyter, pp. 121–165, doi:10.1515/9781614511984.167, ISBN 978-1-61451-252-3
- Poser, William John (1986), "Japanese Evidence Bearing on the Compensatory Lengthening Controversy", in Wetzels, Leo; Sezer, Engin (eds.), Studies in Compensatory Lengthening, Foris Publications, pp. 167–186
- Poser, William John (1990), "Evidence for Foot Structure in Japanese", Language, 66 (1): 78–105, doi:10.1353/lan.1990.0031
- Recasens, Daniel (2013), "On the articulatory classification of (alveolo)palatal consonants" (PDF), Journal of the International Phonetic Association, 43 (1): 1–22, doi:10.1017/S0025100312000199, S2CID 145463946, archived from the original (PDF) on 2021-05-06
- Riney, Timothy James; Takagi, Naoyuki; Ota, Kaori; Uchida, Yoko (2007), "The intermediate degree of VOT in Japanese initial voiceless stops", Journal of Phonetics, 35 (3): 439–443, doi:10.1016/j.wocn.2006.01.002
- Saito, Yoshio (2005), Nihongo Onseigaku Nyūmon 日本語音声学入門 (in Japanese) (2nd ed.), Tokyo: Sanseido, ISBN 4-385-34588-0
- Sakuma, Kanae (1929), Nihon onseigaku [Japanese phonetics], Tokyo: Kyōbunsha
- Sano, Shin-ichiro (2013), "Patterns in Avoidance of Marked Segmental Configurations in Japanese Loanword Phonology" (PDF), Proceedings of GLOW in Asia IX: Main Session: 245–260
- Sano, Shin-ichiro; Ooigawa, Tomohiko (2010). "Distribution and Trichotomic Realization of Voiced Velars in Japanese – An Experimental Study". Proc. Interspeech 2010. pp. 1545–1548. doi:10.21437/Interspeech.2010-450.
- Schourup, Lawrence; Tamori, Ikuhiro (1992), "Japanese Palatalization in Relation to Theories of Restricted Underspecification", Gengo Kenkyu 言語研究, 101: 107–145
- Seward, Jack (1992), Easy Japanese, McGraw-Hill Professional, ISBN 978-0-8442-8495-8
- Shaw, Jason A.; Kawahara, Shigeto (2018), "The lingual articulation of devoiced /u/ in Tokyo Japanese" (PDF), Journal of Phonetics, 66: 100–119, doi:10.1016/j.wocn.2017.09.007
- Shibatani, Masayoshi (1990). The Languages of Japan. Cambridge: Cambridge University Press. ISBN 0-521-36070-6.
- Shinohara, Shigeko (2004), "Emergence of universal grammar in foreign word adaptations", in Kager, René; Pater, Joe; Zonneveld, Wim (eds.), Constraints in Phonological Acquisition, Cambridge University Press, pp. 292–320
- Smith, R. Edward (1980). Natural Phonology of Japanese (Thesis).
- Starr, Rebecca Lurie; Shih, Stephanie S (2017), "The syllable as a prosodic unit in Japanese lexical strata: Evidence from text-setting", Glossa: A Journal of General Linguistics, 2 (1) 93: 1–34, doi:10.5334/gjgl.355
- Takayama, Tomoaki (2015), "Historical phonology", in Kubozono, Haruo (ed.), Handbook of Japanese Phonetics and Phonology, Berlin: De Gruyter, pp. 621–650
- Tamaoka, Katsuo; Makioka, Shogo (2004), "Frequency of occurrence for units of phonemes, morae, and syllables appearing in a lexical corpus of a Japanese newspaper", Behavior Research Methods, Instruments, & Computers, 36 (3): 531–547, doi:10.3758/BF03195600, PMID 15641442
- Tateishi, Koichi (2017), "More Arguments against Japanese as a Mora Language" (PDF), in Kaplan, Aaron; Kaplan, Abby; McCarvel, Miranda K.; Rubin, Edward J. (eds.), Proceedings of the 34th West Coast Conference on Formal Linguistics, Somerville, Massachusetts: Cascadilla Proceedings Project, pp. 529–535, ISBN 978-1-57473-471-3
- Trigo Ferré, Rosario Lorenza (1988), The phonological derivation and behvior of nasal glides (PhD thesis), Massachusetts Institute of Technology, hdl:1721.1/14408
- Tsuchida, Ayako (2001), "Japanese vowel devoicing", Journal of East Asian Linguistics, 10 (3): 225–245, doi:10.1023/A:1011221225072, S2CID 117861220
- Vance, Timothy John (1987). An Introduction to Japanese Phonology. Albany, New York: State University of New York Press. ISBN 0-88706-360-8.
- Vance, Timothy John (October 2008). The Sounds of Japanese with Audio CD. Cambridge; New York: Cambridge University Press. ISBN 978-0-521-61754-3.
- Vance, Timothy John (2015), "Rendaku", in Kubozono, Haruo (ed.), Handbook of Japanese Phonetics and Phonology, Berlin: De Gruyter, pp. 397–441
- Vance, Timothy John (2017), "The Japanese Syllable Debate: A Skeptical Look at Some Anti-Syllable Arguments", Proceedings of GLOW in Asia XI, MIT Working Papers in Linguistics 84, 1
- Vance, Timothy John (2022). Irregular Phonological Marking of Japanese Compounds. De Gruyter.
- Watanabe, Seiji (2009). Cultural and Educational Contributions to Recent Phonological Changes in Japanese (PhD thesis). The University of Arizona. hdl:10150/195117.
- Westbury, John R.; Hashi, Michiko (1997), "Lip-pellet positions during vowels and labial consonants", Journal of Phonetics, 25 (4): 405–419, doi:10.1006/jpho.1997.0050
- Yamada, Tadao; Kuramochi, Yasuo; Uwano, Zendō; Yamada, Akio; Ijima, Masahiro; Sasahara, Hiroyuki, eds. (19 November 2020). 新明解国語辞典 (in Japanese) (8th ed.). Sanseido. ISBN 978-4-385-13078-1.
- Yamane, Noriko; Gick, Bryan (2010), "Speaker-specific place of articulation: Idiosyncratic targets for Japanese coda nasal", Canadian Acoustics, 38 (3): 136–137
- Youngberg, Connor (2021a), "Representing the moraic nasal in Japanese: evidence from Tōkyō, Ōsaka and Kagoshima", Glossa: A Journal of General Linguistics, 6 (1): 1–36, doi:10.5334/gjgl.1099
- Youngberg, Connor (2021b), "The role of the elements in diphthong formation and hiatus resolution: Evidence from Tokyo and Owari Japanese", in Bendjaballah, Sabrina; Tifrit, Ali; Voeltzel, Laurence (eds.), Perspectives on Element Theory, Studies in Generative Grammar, vol. 143, De Gruyter Mouton, pp. 207–249
