= Japanese pitch accent rules (numerals and counters) =

This article is an non-exhaustive list of rules that govern the Tokyo pitch accent of numerals, numbers and number–counter sequences. For other rules, see Japanese pitch accent rules.

Numerals, numbers and counters follow significantly different rules and trends from those of other nouns. Number–counter sequences can also be deaccented when used as adverbs (see Japanese pitch accent rules (non-common nouns) § Nouns used as adverbs).

== Numerals ==
=== Native numerals ===
All the native numerals from one to ten are initial-accented, except hito, futa and kokono which are second-accented:

- hito ~ hi (一; /hi̥tó ~ hí/ 'one'), futa ~ futa (二; /ɸɯ̥tá ~ ɸɯ́/ 'two')
- kokono ~ ko(no) (九; /kokóno ~ kó(no)/ 'nine')
- mi (三; /mí/ 'three'), mu (六; /mɯ́/ 'six'), ya (八; /já/ 'eight'), to (十; /tó/ 'ten')
- yo(n) (四; /jó(N)/ 'four'), i(tsu) (五; /í(tsɯ)/ 'five'), na(na) (七; /ná(na)/ 'seven')
- hī (一(ひい); /híR/ 'one'), mī (三(みい); /míR/ 'three'), ī (五(いい); /íR/ 'five'), fū (二(ふう); /ɸɯ́R/ 'two'), mū (六(むう); /mɯ́R/ 'six'), yō (四(よう); /jóR/ 'four'), tō (十(とお); /tóR/ 'ten'), nā (七(なあ); /náR/ 'seven'), yā (八(やあ); /jáR/ 'eight')

=== Sino-Japanese numerals ===
All simplex Sino-Japanese numerals, except san and oku, are minimally final-accented; if they are unimoraic, or end in a special mora, they are initial-accented; go and ku used to be unaccented (large numbers are translated into English in short scale):

- ichi (一; /icɕí/ 'one'), hachi (八; /hacɕí/ 'eight'), shichi (七; /ɕi̥cɕí/ 'seven'), roku (六; /ɾokɯ́/ 'six'), hyaku (百; /hjakɯ́/ 'hundred')
- ni (二; /ní/ 'two'), shi (四; /ɕí/ 'four')
- go (五; /ɡó ~ ^{†}ɡo/ 'five')
- kyū ~ ku (九; /kjɯ́R ~ kɯ́ ~ ^{†}kɯ/ 'nine')
- rei (零; /ɾéi → ɾéR/ 'zero'), kei (京; /kéi → kéR/ 'ten quadrillion'), jū (十; /ʑɯ́R/ 'ten'), chō (兆; /cɕóR/ 'trillion'), sen (千; /séN/ 'thousand'), man (万; /máN/ 'ten thousand')
- oku (億; /ókɯ/ 'hundred million')
- san (三; /saN/ 'three')

However, when the numerals are enumerated, as in "one, two, three, …," the final-accented numerals and san can become initial-accented. The unimoraic numerals also have initial-accented bimoraic variants with lengthening morae for enumeration:

- ichi, nī, san, {yon ~ shī}, gō, roku, {nana ~ shichi}, hachi, k(y)ū, jū (一、二、三、四、五、六、七、八、九、十; 'one, two, three, four, five, six, seven, eight, nine, ten'): /ícɕi | níR | sáN | {jóN ~ ɕíR} | ɡóR | ɾókɯ | {nána ~ ɕí̥cɕi} | hácɕi | k(j)ɯ́R | ʑɯ́R/

=== Numeral series and decimal parts ===
Numeral series, made of numerals from zero to nine, as used in telephone and serial numbers and decimal parts, follow a specific set of rules:

1. Numerals must be in groups of two if possible.
2. Each group must form an exactly quadrimoraic minor phrase, which means only bimoraic numerals can be used in groups.
3. Each group is penultimate-accented.
4. A lone, ungrouped numeral, however, retains its original accent in its own minor phrase, or becomes dephrased if its nucleus is its final mora.
5. There is disagreement as to whether a lone, originally unimoraic numeral should become bimoraic or remain unimoraic in a numeral series.

Some of these rules also apply to a group of a ones-place numeral and ‑ten (点; /teN/ 'point'), the latter of which functions as the decimal point. This group, however, is minimally accented before ‑ten.

- 03‒5400‒▲▲21: /ɾeR-sáN | ɡoR-jóN | ɾeR-ɾéR | ●●-●● | niR-ícɕi/
- 3.1416: /sáN-teN | icɕi-jóN | icɕi-ɾókɯ/
- 3.1: /sáN-teN | icɕí ~ sáN-teN icɕi/
- 0.1453: /ɾéR-teN | icɕi-jóN | ɡoR-sáN/
- 0.145: /ɾéR-teN | icɕi-jóN | {^{?}ɡóR ~ ɡó} ~ ɾéR-teN | icɕi-jóN ɡo/
- 58.32412: /ɡo-ʑɯR háQ-teN | saN-níR | joN-ícɕi | {^{?}níR ~ ní} ~ ɡo-ʑɯR háQ-teN | saN-níR | joN-ícɕi ni/
- 2.2: /níR-teN | {^{?}níR ~ ní} ~ níR-teN ni/
- 2.22: /níR-teN | niR-níR/
- 2.222: /níR-ten | niR-níR | {^{?}níR ~ ní} ~ níR-ten | niR-níR ni/
- 5.3: /ɡóR-teN (|) saN/
- 15.3: /ʑɯ́R ɡoR-teN (|) saN ~ ʑɯ́R | ɡóR-teN (|) saN/

These rules for the decimal point ‑ten are different from those for the counters ‑ten (see #Sample list). In addition, while the counters often trigger /Q/, the decimal point does not necessarily, especially in broadcasting where it is more desirable for clarity not to have /Q/. One survey finds that there was a slight preference for /Q/ in 一点五 ('1.5') and no /Q/ in 八点五 ('8.5'). Compare:

- 1 point: /iQ-téN/
- 1 item: /íQ-teN/
- 1.5: /icɕí̥-teN ɡo → íQ-teN ɡo/
- 8 points: /hacɕi̥-téN → haQ-téN/
- 8 items: /hacɕí̥-teN → háQ-teN/
- 8.5: /hacɕí̥-teN ɡo → háQ-teN ɡo/

=== English numerals ===
Most organically used numerals are either native or Sino-Japanese, with the sole exception of the Franco-English loanword zero, which can be used for special emphasis. The English numerals from one to ten can be used in exercise and sports, for example to count points under par in golf. English numerals all retain the original English accent:

- zero /ˈzɪːɹəw/ → zero (ゼロ) /zéɾo/
- one /wɐn/ → wan (ワン) /wáN/
- two /tʉw/ → tsū (ツー) /tsɯ́R/
- three /θɹɪj/ → surī (スリー) /sɯɾíR/
- four /foː/ → fō ~ foa (フォー) /ɸóR ~ ɸóa/
- five /fɑjv/ → faibu (ファイブ) /ɸáibɯ/
- six /sɪks/ → shikkusu (シックス) /ɕíQkɯ̥sɯ/
- seven /ˈsɛvən/ → sebun (セブン) /sébɯN/
- eight /ɛjt/ → eito (エイト) /éito → éRto/
- nine /nɑjn/ → nain (ナイン) /náiN/
- ten /tɛn/ → ten (テン) /téN/
- eleven /ɪˈlɛvən/ → irebun (イレブン) /iɾébɯN/
- million /ˈmɪlɪjən/ → mirion (ミリオン) /míɾioN/
- billion /ˈbɪlɪjən/ → birion (ビリオン) /bíɾioN/

English compound numbers behave just like any other type of compound:

- wan + mirion → wan mirion (ワン+ミリオン→ワンミリオン) /wáN + míɾioN → waN míɾioN/

== Numbers ==
Not all the numerals above are frequently used to create numbers productively (excluding collocations and proverbs). The numerals from one to nine can be grouped as follows, based on their behavior in compound numbers:

- Final-accented and Sino-Japanese four (G−1&Shi): /icɕí, hacɕí, ɾokɯ́, ɕí/
- Sino-Japanese seven (Shichi): /ɕi̥cɕí/
- Formerly unaccented, now initial-accented (GX0): /ɡó ~ ^{†}ɡo, kɯ́ ~ ^{†}kɯ/
- Sino-Japanese two (Ni): /ní/
- Initial-accented and native two (G+1&Futa): /kjɯ́R, jóN, nána, ɸɯ̥tá/
- Sino-Japanese three (G0): /saN/

=== Numeral + jū (⟦1; 9⟧ × 10) ===
Jū retains its original nucleus after:

- G−1&Shi: /hacɕi-ʑɯ́R, ɾokɯ-ʑɯ́R, ɕi-ʑɯ́R/
- Shichi: /ɕi̥cɕi-ʑɯ́R/
- GX0: /ɡo-ʑɯ́R, kɯ-ʑɯ́R/

And is preaccenting after:

- Ni: /ní-ʑɯR/
- G+1&Futa: /kjɯ́R-ʑɯR, jóN-ʑɯR, naná-ʑɯR, ɸɯ̥tá-ʑɯR/
- G0: /sáN-ʑɯR/

All these combinations and jū itself can be grouped based on their behavior with following numerals, counters and counter-like numerals as follows (those marked with a superscript question mark are dubious due to inconsistent descriptions among sources):

- Pseudo-unaccented (G[10]X0): /hacɕi-ʑɯ́R, ɾokɯ-ʑɯ́R, ɕi-ʑɯ́R, ɕi̥cɕi-ʑɯ́R, ɡo-ʑɯ́R, kɯ-ʑɯ́R/
- Sino-Japanese ten (Jū): /ʑɯ́R/
- Initial- and second-accented (G[10]+1+2): /ní-ʑɯR, kjɯ́R-ʑɯR, jóN-ʑɯR, ^{?}naná-ʑɯR, ^{?}ɸɯ̥tá-ʑɯR, sáN-ʑɯR/

=== Numeral + hyaku (⟦1; 9⟧ × 100) ===
Hyaku retains its original nucleus after:

- G−1&Shi: /iQ-pjakɯ́, haQ-pjakɯ́, ɾoQ-pjakɯ́, ɕi̥-hjakɯ́/
- GX0: /ɡo-hjakɯ́, kɯ̥-hjakɯ́/
- Ni: /ni-hjakɯ́/

And is preaccenting after:

- G+1&Futa: /kjɯ́R-hjakɯ, jóN-hjakɯ, naná-hjakɯ, ɸɯ̥tá-hjakɯ/
- G0: /sáN-bjakɯ/

And either loses the nucleus or is preaccenting after Shichi: /ɕi̥cɕi-hjakɯ́ ~ ɕicɕí-hjakɯ/

All these combinations and hyaku itself can be grouped based on their behavior with following numerals, counters and counter-like numerals as follows (note that shichihyaku belongs to two different groups, and those marked with a superscript question mark are dubious due to inconsistent descriptions among sources):

- Pseudo-unaccented (G[100]X0): /hjakɯ́, iQ-pjakɯ́, haQ-pjakɯ́, ɾoQ-pjakɯ́, ɕi̥-hjakɯ́, ɡo-hjakɯ́, kɯ̥-hjakɯ́, ni-hjakɯ́, ɕi̥cɕi-hjakɯ́/
- Initial- and second-accented (G[100]+1+2): /kjɯ́R-hjakɯ, jóN-hjakɯ, ^{?}naná-hjakɯ, ^{?}ɸɯ̥tá-hjakɯ, sáN-bjakɯ, ^{?}ɕi̥cɕí-hjakɯ/

=== ‑jū number + numeral (⟦1; 9⟧ × 10 + ⟦1; 9⟧) ===
G[10]X0 lose their nucleus before all groups. Take gojū /ɡo-ʑɯ́R/ as a representative example:

- G−1&Shi: /ɡo-ʑɯR icɕí, ɡo-ʑɯR hacɕí, ɡo-ʑɯR ɾokɯ́, ɡo-ʑɯR ɕí/
- Shichi: /ɡo-ʑɯR ɕi̥cɕí/
- GX0: /ɡo-ʑɯR ɡó, ɡo-ʑɯR kɯ́/
- Ni: /ɡo-ʑɯR ní/
- G+1&Futa: /ɡo-ʑɯR kjɯ́R, ɡo-ʑɯR jóN, ɡo-ʑɯR nána, ɡo-ʑɯR ɸɯ̥tá/
- G0: /ɡo-ʑɯR saN/

Jū /ʑɯ́R/ works similarly, except before:

- GX0: /ʑɯ́R ɡo, ʑɯ́R kɯ/
- G0: /ʑɯ́R saN/

G[10]+1+2 retain their nucleus before all groups. The following numeral can form its own minor phrase:

- G−1&Shi: /ní-ʑɯR icɕi ~ ní-ʑɯR | icɕí, ní-ʑɯR hacɕi ~ ní-ʑɯR | hacɕí, ní-ʑɯR ɾokɯ ~ ní-ʑɯR | ɾokɯ́, ní-ʑɯR ɕi ~ ní-ʑɯR | ɕí/
- Shichi: /ní-ʑɯR ɕi̥cɕi ~ ní-ʑɯR | ɕi̥cɕí/
- GX0: /ní-ʑɯR ɡo ~ ní-ʑɯR | ɡó, ní-ʑɯR kɯ ~ ní-ʑɯR | kɯ́/
- Ni: /ní-ʑɯR ni ~ ní-ʑɯR | ní/
- G+1&Futa: /ní-ʑɯR kjɯR ~ ní-ʑɯR | kjɯ́R, ní-ʑɯR joN ~ ní-ʑɯR | jóN, ní-ʑɯR nana ~ ní-ʑɯR | nána, ní-ʑɯR ɸɯ̥ta ~ ní-ʑɯR | ɸɯ̥tá/
- G0: /ní-ʑɯR (|) saN/

=== ‑hyaku number + number (⟦1; 9⟧ × 100 + ⟦1; 99⟧) ===
G[100]X0 lose their nucleus before all groups as well as larger numbers. Take happyaku /haQ-pjakɯ́/ as a representative example:

- G−1&Shi: /haQ-pjakɯ icɕí, haQ-pjakɯ̥ hacɕí, haQ-pjakɯ ɾokɯ́, haQ-pjakɯ̥ ɕí/
- Shichi: /haQ-pjakɯ̥ ɕi̥cɕí/
- Ni: /haQ-pjakɯ ní/
- G+1&Futa: /haQ-pjakɯ̥ kjɯ́R, haQ-pjakɯ jóN, haQ-pjakɯ nána, haQ-pjakɯ ɸɯ̥tá/
- G0: /haQ-pjakɯ̥ saN/
- Larger:
  - /haQ-pjakɯ ʑɯ́R, haQ-pjakɯ ʑɯ́R saN, haQ-pjakɯ ʑɯ́R ɡo, haQ-pjakɯ ʑɯR ní/
  - /haQ-pjakɯ ní-ʑɯR, haQ-pjakɯ ní-ʑɯR saN, haQ-pjakɯ ní-ʑɯR ɡo ~ haQ-pjakɯ ní-ʑɯR | ɡó, haQ-pjakɯ ní-ʑɯR ni ~ haQ-pjakɯ ní-ʑɯR | ní/
  - /haQ-pjakɯ ɡo-ʑɯ́R, haQ-pjakɯ ɡo-ʑɯR saN, haQ-pjakɯ ɡo-ʑɯR ɡó, haQ-pjakɯ ɡo-ʑɯR ní/

Additionally, the obsolete unaccented pronunciations of GX0 can resurface: /ɡo-hjakɯ ɡó ~ ɡo-hjakɯ ɡo, ɡo-hjakɯ̥ kɯ́ ~ ɡo-hjakɯ̥ kɯ/

G[100]+1+2 retain their nucleus before all groups as well as larger numbers. The following number can form its own minor phrase:

- G−1&Shi: /sáN-bjakɯ icɕi ~ sáN-bjakɯ | icɕí, sáN-bjakɯ̥ hacɕi ~ sáN-bjakɯ̥ | hacɕí, sáN-bjakɯ ɾokɯ ~ sáN-bjakɯ | ɾokɯ́, sáN-bjakɯ̥ ɕi ~ sáN-bjakɯ̥ | ɕí/
- Shichi: /sáN-bjakɯ̥ ɕi̥cɕi ~ sáN-bjakɯ̥ | ɕi̥cɕí/
- GX0: /sáN-bjakɯ ɡo ~ sáN-bjakɯ | ɡó, sáN-bjakɯ̥ kɯ ~ sáN-bjakɯ̥ | kɯ́/
- Ni: /sáN-bjakɯ ni ~ sáN-bjakɯ | ní/
- G+1&Futa: /sáN-bjakɯ̥ kjɯR ~ sáN-bjakɯ̥ | kjɯ́R, sáN-bjakɯ joN ~ sáN-bjakɯ | jóN, sáN-bjakɯ nana ~ sáN-bjakɯ | nána, sáN-bjakɯ ɸɯ̥ta ~ sáN-bjakɯ | ɸɯ̥tá/
- G0: /sáN-bjakɯ̥ (|) saN/
- Larger:
  - /sáN-bjakɯ ʑɯR ~ sáN-bjakɯ | ʑɯ́R, sáN-bjakɯ ʑɯR saN ~ sáN-bjakɯ | ʑɯ́R saN, sáN-bjakɯ ʑɯR ɡo ~ sáN-bjakɯ | ʑɯ́R ɡo, sáN-bjakɯ ʑɯR ni ~ sáN-bjakɯ | ʑɯR ní/
  - /sáN-bjakɯ ni-ʑɯR ~ sáN-bjakɯ | ní-ʑɯR, sáN-bjakɯ ni-ʑɯR saN ~ sáN-bjakɯ | ní-ʑɯR saN, sáN-bjakɯ ni-ʑɯR ɡo ~ sáN-bjakɯ | ní-ʑɯR ɡo ~ sáN-bjakɯ | ní-ʑɯR | ɡó, sáN-bjakɯ ni-ʑɯR ni ~ sáN-bjakɯ | ní-ʑɯR ni ~ sáN-bjakɯ | ní-ʑɯR | ní/
  - /sáN-bjakɯ ɡo-ʑɯR ~ sáN-bjakɯ | ɡo-ʑɯ́R, sáN-bjakɯ (|) ɡo-ʑɯR saN, sáN-bjakɯ ɡo-ʑɯR ɡo ~ sáN-bjakɯ | ɡo-ʑɯR ɡó, sáN-bjakɯ ɡo-ʑɯR ni ~ sáN-bjakɯ | ɡo-ʑɯR ní/

=== Numeral + sen (⟦1; 9⟧ × 1,000) ===
Short compounds with sen /séN/ are all penultimate-accented: /iQ-séN, haQ-séN, ɾokɯ̥-séN, ɕi̥cɕi-séN, ɡo-séN, ni-séN, kjɯR-séN, joN-séN, nana-séN, ɸɯ̥ta-séN, saN-zéN/

Shisen is hypothetically pronounced /ɕi̥-séN/, but it has become fossilized in the kabuki title Shisenryō (四千両; /ɕi-seN-ɾjoR/).

=== Numeral + man ({⟦1; 10⟧; 100; 1,000} × 10,000) ===
In short compounds, man /máN/ behaves like an initial-accented counter:

- All groups except GX0: /icɕi-máN, hacɕi-máN, ɾokɯ-máN, ɕi̥cɕi-máN, ni-máN, kjɯR-máN, joN-máN, nana-máN, ɸɯ̥ta-máN, saN-máN/
  - → /ʑɯR icɕi-máN/
  - → /ní-ʑɯR icɕi-maN ~ ní-ʑɯR | icɕi-máN/
  - → /ɡo-ʑɯR (|) icɕi-máN/
- GX0: /ɡo-máN, kɯ-máN/
  - → /ʑɯ́R ɡo-maN ~ ʑɯ́R | ɡo-máN/
  - → /ní-ʑɯR ɡo-maN ~ ní-ʑɯR | ɡo-máN/
  - → /ɡo-ʑɯR (|) ɡo-máN/
- Larger: /ʑɯR-máN, hjakɯ-máN, seN-máN/

Shiman is hypothetically pronounced /ɕi-máN/, but it has become fossilized in the Buddhist holiday Shiman Rokusennichi (四万六千日; /ɕi-máN ɾokɯ̥-seN-nicɕi ~ ɕi-maN ɾokɯ̥-séN-nicɕi/).

=== Long ‑jū/‑hyaku/‑sen number + man (⟦1; 9⟧ × {10; 100; 1,000} × 10,000) ===
In long compounds, man behaves like an initial-accented or preaccenting counter after G[10]X0, G[100]X0 and ‑sen numbers:

- /ɡo-ʑɯ́R → ɡo-ʑɯR-máN ~ ɡo-ʑɯ́R-maN/
- /ɕi̥cɕi-hjakɯ́ → ɕi̥cɕi-hjakɯ-máN ~ ɕi̥cɕi-hjakɯ́-maN/
- /haQ-pjakɯ́ → haQ-pjakɯ-máN ~ haQ-pjakɯ́-maN/
- /saN-zéN → saN-zeN-máN ~ saN-zéN-maN/
- /hjakɯ̥-séN → hjakɯ̥-seN-máN ~ ^{?}hjakɯ̥-séN-maN/

G[10]+1+2 and G[100]+1+2, additionally retain their nucleus:

- /ní-ʑɯR → ni-ʑɯR-máN ~ ni-ʑɯ́R-maN ~ ní-ʑɯR-maN/
- /naná-ʑɯR → nana-ʑɯR-máN ~ nana-ʑɯ́R-maN ~ naná-ʑɯR-maN/
- /sáN-bjakɯ → saN-bjakɯ-máN ~ saN-bjakɯ́-maN ~ sáN-bjakɯ-maN/
- /naná-hjakɯ → nana-hjakɯ-máN ~ nana-hjakɯ́-maN ~ naná-hjakɯ-maN/
- /ɕi̥cɕí-hjakɯ → ɕi̥cɕi-hjakɯ-máN ~ ɕi̥cɕi-hjakɯ́-maN ~ ɕi̥cɕí-hjakɯ-maN/

=== Numeral or ‑jū/‑hyaku/‑sen number + oku/chō (⟦1; 9⟧ × {1; 10; 100; 1,000} × {10⁸; 10¹²}) ===
Oku /ókɯ/ behaves like a preaccenting counter:

- All groups except GX0: /icɕí-okɯ, hacɕí-okɯ, ɾokɯ́-okɯ, ɕí-okɯ, ɕi̥cɕí-okɯ, ní-okɯ, kjɯ́R-okɯ, jóN-okɯ, naná-okɯ, sáN-okɯ, ʑɯ́R-okɯ, ɡo-ʑɯ́R-okɯ, ni-ʑɯ́R-okɯ, nana-ʑɯ́R-okɯ, hjakɯ́-okɯ, haQ-pjakɯ́-okɯ, saN-bjakɯ́-okɯ, nana-hjakɯ́-okɯ/
  - → /ʑɯR icɕí-okɯ/
  - → /ní-ʑɯR icɕi-okɯ ~ ní-ʑɯR | icɕí-okɯ/
  - → /ɡo-ʑɯR (|) icɕí-okɯ/
- GX0: /ɡó-okɯ/
  - → /ʑɯ́R ɡo-okɯ ~ ʑɯ́R | ɡó-okɯ/
  - → /ní-ʑɯR ɡo-okɯ ~ ní-ʑɯR | ɡó-okɯ/
  - → /ɡo-ʑɯR (|) ɡó-okɯ/
- Larger: /séN-okɯ, saN-zéN-okɯ/

Chō /cɕóR/ behaves like an initial-accented or preaccenting counter:

- All groups except GX0: /íQ-cɕoR ~ iQ-cɕóR, háQ-cɕoR ~ haQ-cɕóR, ɾokɯ̥́-cɕoR ~ ɾokɯ̥-cɕóR, ɕi̥cɕí-cɕoR ~ ɕi̥cɕi-cɕóR, ní-cɕoR ~ ni-cɕóR, kjɯ́R-cɕoR ~ kjɯR-cɕóR, jóN-cɕoR ~ joN-cɕóR, naná-cɕoR ~ nana-cɕóR, sáN-cɕoR ~ saN-cɕóR, ʑíQ-cɕoR ~ ʑiQ-cɕóR ~ ʑɯ́Q-cɕoR ~ ʑɯQ-cɕóR, ɡo-ʑíQ-cɕoR ~ ɡo-ʑiQ-cɕóR ~ ɡo-ʑɯ́Q-cɕoR ~ ɡo-ʑɯQ-cɕóR, ni-ʑíQ-cɕoR ~ ni-ʑiQ-cɕóR ~ ni-ʑɯ́Q-cɕoR ~ ni-ʑɯQ-cɕóR, nana-ʑíQ-cɕoR ~ nana-ʑiQ-cɕóR ~ nana-ʑɯ́Q-cɕoR ~ nana-ʑɯQ-cɕóR, hjakɯ̥́-cɕoR ~ hjakɯ̥-cɕóR, haQ-pjakɯ̥́-cɕoR ~ haQ-pjakɯ̥-cɕóR, saN-bjakɯ̥́-cɕoR ~ saN-bjakɯ̥-cɕóR, nana-hjakɯ̥́-cɕoR ~ nana-hjakɯ̥-cɕóR/
  - → /ʑɯR íQ-cɕoR ~ ʑɯR iQ-cɕóR/
  - → /ní-ʑɯR iQ-cɕoR ~ ní-ʑɯR | íQ-cɕoR ~ ní-ʑɯR | iQ-cɕóR/
  - → /ɡo-ʑɯR (|) íQ-cɕoR ~ ɡo-ʑɯR (|) iQ-cɕóR/
- GX0: /ɡó-cɕoR ~ ɡo-cɕóR/
  - → /ʑɯ́R ɡo-cɕoR ~ ʑɯ́R | ɡó-cɕoR ~ ʑɯ́R | ɡo-cɕóR/
  - → /ní-ʑɯR ɡo-cɕoR ~ ní-ʑɯR | ɡó-cɕoR ~ ní-ʑɯR | ɡo-cɕóR/
  - → /ɡo-ʑɯR (|) ɡó-cɕoR ~ ɡo-ʑɯR (|) ɡo-cɕóR/
- Larger: /séN-cɕoR ~ seN-cɕóR, saN-zéN-cɕoR ~ saN-zeN-cɕóR/

=== ‑sen or larger number + number ({⟦1; 9⟧ × 1,000 + ⟦1; 999⟧; ⟦1; 9,999⟧ × {𝑥 ∈ ℕ⁺ | 𝑥 ⋮ 10,000} + ⟦1; 𝑥 − 1⟧}) ===
‑sen and larger numbers normally combine with other numbers as separable minor phrase:

- /séN ɡo-hjakɯ ~ séN | ɡo-hjakɯ́/
- /icɕí-okɯ | ɡo-séN kjɯR-hjakɯ ɾokɯ-ʑɯR-maN | saN-zéN saN-bjakɯ ni-ʑɯR icɕi
  ~ icɕí-okɯ | ɡo-séN | kjɯ́R-hjakɯ | ɾokɯ-ʑɯR-máN | saN-zéN | sáN-bjakɯ ni-ʑɯR icɕi
  ~ icɕí-okɯ | ɡo-séN | kjɯ́R-hjakɯ | ɾokɯ-ʑɯR-máN | saN-zéN | sáN-bjakɯ | ní-ʑɯR | icɕí/

In some contexts such as sport, it is not impossible for the first component to lose its nucleus: /seN ɡo-hjakɯ́/

== Indefinite + number ==
There are three indefinites, which express "tens/hundreds/thousands (of people/things)," that can prefix multiples of ten as follows:

Indefinite Multiple of ten	nan‑ (何; /náN/)	iku‑ (幾)	sū‑ (数; /sɯ́R/)
jū (十; /ʑɯ́R/ 'ten')	/náN-ʑɯR/	/íkɯ-ʑɯR/	/sɯ́R-ʑɯR/
hyaku (百; /hjakɯ́/ 'hundred')	/náN-bjakɯ/	/íkɯ̥-hjakɯ/	/sɯ́R-hjakɯ/
sen (千; /séN/ 'thousand')	/naN-zéN ~ náN-zeN/	/ikɯ̥-séN ~ íkɯ̥-seN/	/sɯR-séN ~ sɯ́R-seN/
man (万; /máN/ 'ten thousand')	/naN-máN ~ náN-maN/	/ikɯ-máN ~ íkɯ-maN/	/sɯR-máN ~ sɯ́R-maN/
jūman (十万; /ʑɯR-máN/ 'hundred thousand')	/naN-ʑɯR-máN ~ naN-ʑɯ́R-maN ~ náN-ʑɯR-maN/	/ikɯ-ʑɯR-máN ~ ikɯ-ʑɯ́R-maN ~ íkɯ-ʑɯR-maN/	/sɯR-ʑɯR-máN ~ sɯR-ʑɯ́R-maN ~ sɯ́R-ʑɯR-maN/
hyakuman (百万; /hjakɯ-máN/ 'million')	/naN-bjakɯ-máN ~ naN-bjakɯ́-maN ~ náN-bjakɯ-maN/	/ikɯ̥-hjakɯ-máN ~ ikɯ̥-hjakɯ́-maN ~ íkɯ̥-hjakɯ-maN/	/sɯR-hjakɯ-máN ~ sɯR-hjakɯ́-maN ~ sɯ́R-hjakɯ-maN/
senman (千万; /seN-máN/ 'ten million')	/naN-zeN-máN ~ naN-zéN-maN ~ náN-zeN-maN/	/ikɯ̥-seN-máN ~ ikɯ̥-séN-maN ~ íkɯ̥-seN-maN/	/sɯR-seN-máN ~ sɯR-séN-maN/
oku (億; /ókɯ/ 'hundred million')	/náN-okɯ/	/íkɯ-okɯ/	/sɯ́R-okɯ/
jūoku (十億; /ʑɯ́R-okɯ/ 'billion')	/naN-ʑɯ́R-okɯ ~ náN-ʑɯR-okɯ/	/ikɯ-ʑɯ́R-okɯ ~ íkɯ-ʑɯR-okɯ/	/sɯR-ʑɯ́R-okɯ ~ sɯ́R-ʑɯR-okɯ/
hyakuoku (百億; /hjakɯ́-okɯ/ 'ten billion')	/naN-bjakɯ́-okɯ ~ náN-bjakɯ-okɯ/	/ikɯ̥-hjakɯ́-okɯ ~ íkɯ̥-hjakɯ-okɯ/	/sɯR-hjakɯ́-okɯ ~ sɯ́R-hjakɯ-okɯ/
chō (兆; /cɕóR/ 'trillion')	/náN-cɕoR ~ naN-cɕóR/	/íkɯ̥-cɕoR ~ ikɯ̥-cɕóR/	/sɯ́R-cɕoR ~ sɯR-cɕóR/

== Number/indefinite + counter ==
Counters are usually dominant and determine the accent pattern of numeral–counter compounds. Each counter follows a specific set of numerals and has a specific accent type with specific exceptions.

=== Native numeral + native counter ===
Short counters tend to be preaccenting. Futa may make final-accented compounds, although they may sometimes be regularized by younger speakers:

- ‑e (重; 'layer'): /hi̥tó-e, ɸɯ̥tá-e ~ ɸɯ̥ta-é, míe ~ mié, itsɯ́-e, naná-e, jáe ~ jaé, kokonó-e, tó-e, hatá-e (Note: Twenty layers.)/
- ‑te (手; /té/ 'a hand → board-game move'): /hi̥tó-te, ɸɯ̥ta-té ~ ɸɯ̥ta-te ~ ɸɯ̥tá-te, mí-te/
- ‑ma (間; /ma/ 'room'): /hi̥tó-ma, ɸɯ̥tá-ma, míma ~ mimá/
- ‑(ta)ri (人; 'person'): /hi̥tó-ɾi, ɸɯ̥ta-ɾí, mí-taɾi, joQ-taɾí ~ joQ-táɾi ~ jó-taɾi/
- ‑iro (色; /iɾó/ 'color'): /hi̥tó-iɾo, ɸɯ̥tá-iɾo, mí-iɾo/
- ‑koto (言; /kotó/ 'word'): /hi̥tó-koto, ɸɯ̥tákoto ~ ɸɯ̥takotó ~ ɸɯ̥takoto, mí-koto/
- ‑suji (筋; /sɯ́ʑi/ 'a strand → long and thin thing'): /hi̥tó-sɯʑi, ɸɯ̥tá-sɯʑi ~ ɸɯ̥ta-sɯʑí ~ ɸɯ̥ta-sɯʑi, mí-sɯʑi/
- ‑tsuki (月; /tsɯ̥kí/ 'the moon → month'): /hi̥tó-tsɯ̥ki, ɸɯ̥tá-tsɯ̥ki ~ ɸɯ̥ta-tsɯ̥kí, mí-tsɯ̥ki, jó-tsɯ̥ki, itsɯ́-tsɯ̥ki, mɯ́-tsɯ̥ki, naná-tsɯ̥ki, já-tsɯ̥ki, tó-tsɯ̥ki, kokonó-tsɯ̥ki/
- ‑tsubu (粒; /tsɯ́bɯ/ 'a grain → small and round thing'): /hi̥tó-tsɯbɯ, mí-tsɯbɯ/
- ‑tose (年; 'year'): /hi̥tó-tose, mí-tose/
- ‑hako (箱; /hako/ 'box'): /hi̥tó-hako, mí-hako/
- ‑hachi (鉢; /hacɕí/ 'bowl'): /hi̥tó-hacɕi, ɸɯ̥ta-hacɕi/
- ‑mune (棟; /mɯné/ 'a roof → house'): /hi̥tó-mɯne, mí-mɯne/
- ‑yama (山; /jamá/ 'mountain → pile'): /hi̥tó-jama, mí-jama/
- ‑kire (切れ; /kíɾe → kiɾé/ 'getting sliced → slice'): /hi̥tó-kiɾe, mí-kiɾe/
- ‑kumi (組み→組; /kɯ́mi → kɯmí/ 'banding → group'): /hi̥tó-kɯmi, ɸɯ̥tá-kɯmi ~ ɸɯ̥ta-kɯmí ~ ɸɯ̥ta-kɯmi, mí-kɯmi/
- ‑sashi (差し; /sáɕi → saɕí/ 'reaching forward in a dance → dance with forward reaching'): /hi̥tó-saɕi/

Long counters may be initial-accented after unimoraic numerals, and preaccenting after bimoraic numerals:

- ‑hashira (柱; /haɕiɾá ~ haɕiɾa/ 'a pillar → deity'): /hi̥tó-haɕiɾa, ɸɯ̥ta-haɕiɾá, mi-háɕiɾa, jo-háɕiɾa, itsɯ̥́-haɕiɾa, mɯ-háɕiɾa, naná-haɕiɾa, ja-háɕiɾa/
- ‑mukashi (昔; /mɯkaɕi/ 'antiquity → decade ago'): /hi̥tó-mɯkaɕi ~ hi̥tomɯ́kaɕi, ɸɯ̥ta-mɯkaɕí/
- ‑tsuzuki (続き; /tsɯzɯki/ 'continuation → series'): /hi̥tó-tsɯzɯki ~ hi̥to-tsɯ́zɯki/
- ‑hikari (光り→光; /hi̥káɾi → hi̥kaɾí/ 'shining → light'): /nana-hí̥kaɾi ~ naná-hi̥kaɾi/

==== ‑tsu ====
The native numerals from one to nine are usually used with the generic native counter ‑tsu. Of these combinations, all those containing /Q/ are final-accented, while the rest are second-accented; however, the /Q/-less variants can be final- or initial-accented as well:

- hitotsu (一つ; /hi̥tó-tsɯ/ 'one thing'), itsutsu (五つ; /itsɯ́-tsɯ ~ itsɯ̥́-tsɯ/ 'five things'), nanatsu (七つ; /naná-tsɯ/ 'seven things')
- kokonotsu (九つ; /kokóno-tsɯ/ 'nine things')
- futa(t)tsu (二つ; /ɸɯ̥ta(Q)-tsɯ́/ 'two things')
- mi(t)tsu) (三つ; /mi(Q)-tsɯ́ ~ mí-tsɯ/ 'three things'), yo(t)tsu (四つ; /jo(Q)-tsɯ́ ~ jó-tsɯ/ 'four things'), mu(t)tsu (六つ; /mɯ(Q)-tsɯ́ ~ mɯ́-tsɯ/ 'six things'), ya(t)tsu (八つ; /ja(Q)-tsɯ́ ~ já-tsɯ/ 'eight things')

When these ‑tsu words are used as modifiers in compounds, ‑tsu tends to be the nucleus:

- hitotsu + mi → hitotsumi (一つ+身→一つ身; 'one thing + one's body → a one-piece kimono'): /hi̥tó-tsɯ + mi → hi̥to-tsɯ́-mi/
- hitotsu + hoshi → Hitotsuboshi (一つ+星→一つ星; 'one thing + a star → the One Star → Venus'): /hi̥tó-tsɯ + hoɕi → hi̥to-tsɯ́-boɕi/
- mitsu + hoshi → mitsuboshi → Mitsuboshi (三つ+星→三つ星; 'three things + a star → three stars → the Three Stars (Note: Some three stars in Orion.)'): /mi-tsɯ́ ~ mí-tsɯ + hoɕi → mi-tsɯ́-boɕi/
- yatsu + hashi → yatsuhashi (八つ+橋→八つ橋; 'eight things + a bridge → an eight-plank bridge'): /ja-tsɯ́ ~ já-tsɯ + haɕí → ja-tsɯ̥́-haɕi/

However, hitotsu meaning 'the same' tends to keep its original accent:

- hitotsu + kama → hitotsukama (一つ+釜→一つ釜; 'the same + a rice pot → the same pot'): /hi̥tó-tsɯ + kama → hi̥tó-tsɯ̥-kama/
- hitotsu + tokoro → hitotsutokoro (一つ+所→一つ所; 'the same + a place → the same place'): /hi̥tó-tsɯ + tokoɾo → hi̥tó-tsɯ̥-tokoɾo/
- hitotsu + koto → hitotsukoto (一つ+事→一つ事; 'the same + a matter → the same matter'): /hi̥tó-tsɯ + kotó → hi̥tó-tsɯ̥-koto/
- hitotsu + hanashi → hitotsuhanashi (一つ+話→一つ話; 'the same + a story → the same story'): /hi̥tó-tsɯ + hanaɕí → hi̥tó-tsɯ̥-hanaɕi/

=== Other combinations ===
Idiomatic or high-frequency compounds may be unaccented: hachigake (八掛け; /hacɕi-ɡake/ '80 percent'), ittai (一体; /iQ-tai/ 'one body → what on earth? ~ strictly speaking'), ittsui (一対; /iQ-tsɯi/ 'one pair'), ippon (一本; /iQ-poN/ 'a certain book'; compare /íQ-poN/ 'one long and thin object'), ichiritsu (一律; /icɕi-ɾitsɯ/ 'uniformity'), ichiryū (一流; /icɕi-ɾjɯR/ 'the first tier → the top tier'), sanbō (三方; /saN-boR/; compare /saN-bóR ~ saN-póR/ 'three sides'), sanbon (三盆; /saN-boN/ 'three trays → Japanese fine sugar'), sanmai (三枚; /saN-mai ~ sáN-mai/ 'two pieces of flesh and one skeleton → a three-piece fillet'; compare /sáN-mai/ 'three sheets'), Rikugei (六芸; /ɾikɯ-ɡei ~ ɾikɯ́-ɡei/ 'the Six Arts'), Rikuchō (六朝; /ɾikɯ̥-cɕoR/ 'the Six Dynasties'), etc.

Long native counters tend to form regular long compounds:

- ‑hashira (柱; /haɕiɾá ~ haɕiɾa/ 'a pillar → deity'): /ʑɯR-ɡo-háɕiɾa, ɡo-ʑɯR-háɕiɾa/
- ‑monogatari (物語; /monoɡátaɾi/ 'tale'): /hjakɯ-monoɡátaɾi/

==== Number groups ====
The aforementioned number groups can be reorganized based on their behavior with counters as follows:

- Sino-Japanese one (Ichi): /icɕí/
- Sino-Japanese eleven (JI): /ʑɯR icɕí/
- Sino-Japanese ten (Jū): /ʑɯ́R/
- Final-accented (G−1): /hacɕí, ɾokɯ́, hjakɯ́/
- 10 + G−1 (J−1): /ʑɯR hacɕí, ʑɯR ɾokɯ́/
- Sino-Japanese two, four and seven (GNSS): /ní, ɕí, ɕi̥cɕí/
- 10 + GNSS (JNSS): /ʑɯR ní, ʑɯR ɕí, ʑɯR ɕi̥cɕí/
- Initial-accented and less than ten (G+1): /kjɯ́R, jóN, nána/
- 10 + G+1 (J+1): /ʑɯR kjɯ́R, ʑɯR jóN, ʑɯR nána/
- Formerly unaccented and unimoraic native four (GX0&Yo): /ɡó ~ ^{†}ɡo, kɯ́ ~ ^{†}kɯ, jó/
- 10 + GX0&Yo (JX0&Yo): /ʑɯ́R ɡo, ʑɯ́R kɯ/, jū yo‑
- Sino-Japanese three (G0): /saN/
- Sino-Japanese thirteen (J0): /ʑɯ́R saN/
- Pseudo-unaccented (GJHX0): /ɕi-ʑɯ́R, ɡo-ʑɯ́R, kɯ-ʑɯ́R, hacɕi-ʑɯ́R, ɕi̥cɕi-ʑɯ́R, ɾokɯ-ʑɯ́R, iQ-pjakɯ́, haQ-pjakɯ́, ɾoQ-pjakɯ́, ni-hjakɯ́, ɕi̥-hjakɯ́, ɡo-hjakɯ́, ɕi̥cɕi-hjakɯ́/
- Initial- and second-ccented and divisible by ten (GJH+1+2): /ní-ʑɯR, kjɯ́R-ʑɯR, sáN-ʑɯR, jóN-ʑɯR, sáN-bjakɯ, jóN-hjakɯ, kjɯ́R-hjakɯ, naná-hjakɯ, ɕi̥cɕí-hjakɯ/
- Half-native and half-Sino-Japanese seventy (Nanajū): /naná-ʑɯR/
- Sino-Japanese one thousand (Sen): /séN/
- Compound numbers divisible by one thousand (GSC): /iQ-séN, ni-séN, saN-zéN, …, icɕi-máN, ni-máN, saN-máN, …, ʑɯR-máN, …/

==== Counter groups ====
Just like compound heads (see Japanese pitch accent rules § Modifier–head compound nouns), counters can be short or long, and be preaccenting, deaccenting, final-accented, initial-accented or retain their original accent. They may behave uniformly with all numbers, or have specific patterns with specific numbers.

===== Short counters =====
Of the number groups, GSC in particular tends to form unaccented combinations with short counters, despite their uniform behavior with other numbers. GX0&Yo forms two separable minor phrases, the first of which is jū with its original accent, the second is go, ku or yo with the counter, unless the counter in question uniformly results in unaccented or final-accented sequences with all numbers, in which case GX0&Yo behaves exactly like other groups. In some cases, JI, J−1, JNSS, J+1 and J0 may be more uniform compared to ichi, G−1, GNSS, G+1 and G0.

GJHX0, GJH+1+2 and nanajū forms the first minor phrase before any numeral–counter sequence, in the same ways shown in the #Numbers section. When GJH+1+2 connects directly to a counter, they traditionally retain their original accent, and innovatively follow whichever pattern is more dominant, usually the preaccenting one. NHK Broadcasting Culture Research Institute (2025:[88]–[173]) does not show any instance where nanajū behaves similarly, while Kindaichi & Akinaga (2025:658) lists some examples where nanajū and nanahyaku also retain their original accent.

The following are groups of counters with some representative examples:

- Preaccenting after all number groups except GSC (CS_P). Eg: ‑fun/‑pun (分; /ɸɯ́N/ 'minute'):
  - Ichi, JI: /íQ-pɯN, ʑɯR íQ-pɯN/
  - Jū: /ʑíQ-pɯN/
  - G−1, J−1: /háQ-pɯN, ʑɯR háQ-pɯN, ɾóQ-pɯN, ʑɯR ɾóQ-pɯN/
  - GNSS, JNSS: /ní-ɸɯN, ʑɯR ní-ɸɯN/
  - G+1, J+1: /kjɯ́R-ɸɯN, ʑɯR kjɯ́R-ɸɯN, jóN-pɯN, ʑɯR jóN-pɯN, naná-ɸɯN, ʑɯR naná-ɸɯN/
  - GX0&Yo: /ɡó-ɸɯN/
    - JX0&Yo: /ʑɯ́R ɡo-ɸɯN ~ ʑɯ́R | ɡó-ɸɯN/
  - G0, J0: /sáN-pɯN, ʑɯR sáN-pɯN/
  - GJHX0: /hacɕi-ʑíQ-pɯN, haQ-pjáQ-pɯN/
  - GJH+1+2: /saN-ʑíQ-pɯN ~ sáN-ʑiQ-pɯN, saN-bjáQ-pɯN ~ sáN-bjaQ-pɯN/
  - Sen: /séN-pɯN/
  - GSC: /icɕi-maN-pɯN/
- Deaccenting after GX0&Yo, JX0&Yo and GSC, and preaccenting after all other number groups (CS_P_DX0). Note that JX0&Yo still forms two separable phrases. Eg: ‑dai (代; /dái/ 'thin and flat object'):
  - Ichi, JI: /icɕí-dai, ʑɯR icɕí-dai/
  - Jū: /ʑɯ́R-dai/
  - G−1, J−1: /hacɕí-dai, ʑɯR hacɕí-dai, ɾokɯ́-dai, ʑɯR ɾokɯ́-dai/
  - GNSS, JNSS: /ní-dai, ʑɯR ní-dai/
  - G+1, J+1: /kjɯ́R-dai, ʑɯR kjɯ́R-dai, jóN-dai, ʑɯR jóN-dai, naná-dai, ʑɯR naná-dai/
  - GX0&Yo: /ɡo-dai/
    - JX0&Yo: /ʑɯ́R (|) ɡo-dai/
  - G0, J0: /sáN-dai, ʑɯR sáN-dai/
  - GJHX0: /hacɕi-ʑɯ́R-dai, haQ-pjakɯ́-dai/
  - GJH+1+2: /saN-ʑɯ́R-dai, saN-bjakɯ́-dai/
  - Sen: /séN-dai/
  - GSC: /icɕi-maN-dai/
- Deaccenting after GX0&Yo, JX0&Yo, GSC and G0, and preaccenting after all other number groups except GSC (CS_P_D0X0). Note that JX0&Yo still forms two separable phrases, and G0 additionally becomes regularized after GJHX0 and GJH+1+2. Eg: ‑ban (番; /báN/ '‑th numerical label'):
  - Ichi, JI: /icɕí-baN, ʑɯR icɕí-baN/
  - Jū: /ʑɯ́R-baN/
  - G−1, J−1: /hacɕí-baN, ʑɯR hacɕí-baN, ɾokɯ́-baN, ʑɯR ɾokɯ́-baN/
  - GNSS, JNSS: /ní-baN, ʑɯR ní-baN/
  - G+1, J+1: /kjɯ́R-baN, ʑɯR kjɯ́R-baN, jóN-baN, ʑɯR jóN-baN, naná-baN, ʑɯR naná-baN/
  - GX0&Yo: /ɡo-baN/
    - JX0&Yo: /ʑɯ́R (|) ɡo-baN/
  - G0: /saN-baN/
    - J0: /ʑɯR sáN-baN/
    - GHX0 + G0: /hacɕi-ʑɯR (|) saN-baN ~ hacɕi-ʑɯR (|) sáN-baN/
    - GJH+1+2 + G0: /sáN-ʑɯR (|) saN-baN ~ sáN-ʑɯR | sáN-baN/
  - GJHX0: /hacɕi-ʑɯ́R-baN, haQ-pjakɯ́-baN/
  - GJH+1+2: /saN-ʑɯ́R-baN, saN-bjakɯ́-baN/
  - Sen: /séN-baN/
  - GSC: /icɕi-maN-baN/
- Initial-accented after ichi, jū, G−1, GNSS, GX0&Yo, JX0&Yo, G0 and sen, and preaccenting after all other number groups except GSC; in other words, these counters are initial-accented after all single numerals except G+1 (CS_P_+1S!+1). G0 additionally becomes regularized after GJHX0 and GJHX+1+2, and some of these counters may be completely regularized into CS_P, or the counters can be initial-accented after all single numerals without any other preceding numerals, as well as JI, J−1, JNSS, J0 and J+1 (CS_P_+1SJ). Eg: ‑kai (回; /kái/ 'occurrence'):
  - Ichi: /iQ-kái/
    - JI: /ʑɯR íQ-kai ~ ʑɯR iQ-kái/
  - Jū: /ʑiQ-kái/
  - G−1: /hacɕi̥-kái → haQ-kái, ɾoQ-kái/
    - J−1: /{ʑɯR hacɕí̥-kai → ʑɯR háQ-kai} ~ {ʑɯR hacɕi̥-kái → ʑɯR haQ-kái}, ʑɯR ɾóQ-kai ~ ʑɯR ɾoQ-kái/
  - GNSS: /ni-kái/
    - JNSS: /ʑɯR ní-kai ~ ʑɯR ni-kái/
  - G+1, J+1: /kjɯ́R-kai ~ kjɯR-kái, ʑɯR kjɯ́R-kai ~ ʑɯR kjɯR-kái, jóN-kai ~ joN-kái, ʑɯR jóN-kai ~ ʑɯR joN-kái, naná-kai ~ nana-kái, ʑɯR naná-kai ~ ʑɯR nana-kái/
  - GX0&Yo: /ɡo-kái/
    - JX0&Yo: /ʑɯ́R ɡo-kai ~ ʑɯ́R | ɡo-kái/
  - G0: /saN-kái/
    - J0: /ʑɯR sáN-kai ~ ʑɯR saN-kái/
    - GHX0 + G0: /hacɕi-ʑɯR (|) saN-kái ~ hacɕi-ʑɯR (|) sáN-kai/
    - GJH+1+2 + G0: /sáN-ʑɯR saN-kai ~ sáN-ʑɯR | saN-kái ~ sáN-ʑɯR | sáN-kai/
  - GJHX0: /hacɕi-ʑíQ-kai, haQ-pjáQ-kai/
  - GJH+1+2: /saN-ʑíQ-kai ~ sáN-ʑiQ-kai, saN-bjáQ-kai ~ sáN-bjaQ-kai/
  - Sen: /seN-kái ~ séN-kai/
  - GSC: /icɕi-maN-kai/
- Initial-accented after ichi, jū, G−1, GNSS, GX0&Yo and JX0&Yo, and preaccenting after all other number groups except GSC; in other words, these counters are initial-accented after all single numerals except G+1 and G0 (CS_P_+1S!+1!0). Some of these counters may be completely regularized into CS_P, or the counters can be initial-accented after all single numerals without any other preceding numerals, as well as JI, J−1, JNSS, J0 and J+1 (CS_P_+1SJ). Eg: ‑gō (合; /ɡóR/) and ‑sun (寸; /sɯ́N/):
  - Ichi: /icɕi-ɡóR ~ icɕí-ɡoR/; /iQ-sɯ́N ~ íQ-sɯN/
    - JI: /ʑɯR icɕí-ɡoR ~ ʑɯR icɕi-ɡóR/
  - Jū: /ʑɯ́R-ɡoR/; /ʑiQ-sɯ́N ~ ʑíQ-sɯN/
  - G−1: /hacɕi-ɡóR ~ hacɕí-ɡoR, ɾokɯ-ɡóR ~ ɾokɯ́-ɡoR/; /ɾokɯ̥-sɯ́N ~ ɾokɯ̥́-sɯN/
    - J−1: /ʑɯR hacɕí-ɡoR ~ ʑɯR hacɕi-ɡóR, ʑɯR ɾokɯ́-ɡoR ~ ʑɯR ɾokɯ-ɡóR/
  - GNSS: /ni-ɡóR ~ ní-ɡoR/; /ni-sɯ́N ~ ní-sɯN/
    - JNSS: /ʑɯR ní-ɡoR ~ ʑɯR ni-ɡóR/
  - G+1, J+1: /kjɯ́R-ɡoR ~ kjɯR-ɡóR, ʑɯR kjɯ́R-ɡoR ~ ʑɯR kjɯR-ɡóR, jóN-ɡoR ~ joN-ɡóR, ʑɯR jóN-ɡoR ~ ʑɯR joN-ɡóR, naná-ɡoR ~ nana-ɡóR, ʑɯR naná-ɡoR ~ ʑɯR nana-ɡóR/; /kjɯ́R-sɯN, jóN-sɯN, naná-sɯN/
  - GX0&Yo: /ɡo-ɡóR ~ ɡó-ɡoR/; /ɡo-sɯ́N ~ ɡó-sɯN/
    - JX0&Yo: /ʑɯ́R ɡo-ɡoR ~ ʑɯ́R | ɡo-ɡóR ~ ʑɯ́R | ɡó-ɡoR/
  - G0: /sáN-ɡoR/; /sáN-zɯN/
    - J0: /ʑɯR sáN-ɡoR/
    - GHX0 + G0: /hacɕi-ʑɯR (|) sáN-ɡoR/
    - GJH+1+2 + G0: /sáN-ʑɯR saN-ɡoR ~ sáN-ʑɯR | sáN-ɡoR/
  - GJHX0: /hacɕi-ʑɯ́R-ɡoR, haQ-pjakɯ́-ɡoR/
  - GJH+1+2: /saN-ʑɯ́R-ɡoR ~ sáN-ʑɯR-ɡoR, saN-bjakɯ́-ɡoR ~ sáN-ʑɯR-ɡoR/
  - Sen: /séN-ɡoR ~ seN-ɡóR/
  - GSC: /icɕi-maN-ɡoR/
- Final-accented after ichi, JI, jū, G−1, and J−1, and preaccenting after all other number groups except GSC (CS_P_−1SJQK). Ichi, JI and jū always trigger /Q/ with these counters, while hachi and jū hachi sometimes do, and roku, jū roku and hyaku even less frequently so. G−1, J−1 and sometimes JI may be regularized with some counters. These counters tend to end in ‑ki, ‑ku, ‑chi or ‑tsu. Eg: ‑satsu (冊; 'book'):
  - Ichi, JI: /iQ-satsɯ́, ʑɯR iQ-satsɯ́/
  - Jū: /ʑiQ-satsɯ́/
  - G−1, J−1: /haQ-satsɯ́ ~ háQ-satsɯ, ʑɯR haQ-satsɯ́ ~ ʑɯR háQ-satsɯ, ɾokɯ̥-satsɯ́ ~ ɾokɯ̥́-satsɯ, ʑɯR ɾokɯ̥-satsɯ́ ~ ʑɯR ɾokɯ̥́-satsɯ/
  - GNSS, JNSS: /ní-satsɯ, ʑɯR ní-satsɯ/
  - G+1, J+1: /kjɯ́R-satsɯ, ʑɯR kjɯ́R-satsɯ, jóN-satsɯ, ʑɯR jóN-satsɯ, naná-satsɯ, ʑɯR naná-satsɯ/
  - GX0&Yo: /ɡó-satsɯ/
    - JX0&Yo: /ʑɯ́R ɡo-satsɯ ~ ʑɯ́R | ɡó-satsɯ/
  - G0, J0: /sáN-satsɯ, ʑɯR sáN-satsɯ/
  - GJHX0: /hacɕi-ʑíQ-satsɯ, haQ-pjakɯ̥́-satsɯ/
  - GJH+1+2: /saN-ʑíQ-satsɯ ~ sáN-ʑiQ-satsɯ, saN-bjakɯ̥́-satsɯ ~ sáN-bjakɯ̥́-satsɯ/
  - Sen: /séN-satsɯ/
  - GSC: /icɕi-maN-satsɯ/
- Final-accented after ichi, JI, G−1, J−1, GNSS, JNSS, GX0&Yo and JX0&Yo, and preaccenting after all other number groups except GSC; in other words, these counters are final-accented after all single numerals except G+1, G0 and sen, as well as after J+1 and J0 (CS_P_−1SJ!+1!0!Sen). Eg: ‑shaku/‑jaku (尺; /ɕakɯ́/):
  - Ichi, JI: /iQ-ɕakɯ́, ʑɯR iQ-ɕakɯ́/
  - Jū: /ʑiQ-ɕakɯ́/
  - G−1, J−1: /haQ-ɕakɯ́, ʑɯR haQ-ɕakɯ́, ɾokɯ̥-ɕakɯ́, ʑɯR ɾokɯ̥-ɕakɯ́/
  - GNSS, JNSS: /ni-ɕakɯ́, ʑɯR ni-ɕakɯ́/
  - G+1, J+1: /kjɯ́R-ɕakɯ, ʑɯR kjɯ́R-ɕakɯ, jóN-ɕakɯ, ʑɯR jóN-ɕakɯ, naná-ɕakɯ, ʑɯR naná-ɕakɯ/
  - GX0&Yo: /ɡo-ɕakɯ́/
    - JX0&Yo: /ʑɯ́R ɡo-ɕakɯ ~ ʑɯ́R | ɡo-ɕakɯ́/
  - G0, J0: /sáN-ʑakɯ, ʑɯR sáN-ʑakɯ/
  - GJHX0: /hacɕi-ʑíQ-ɕakɯ, haQ-pjakɯ̥́-ɕakɯ/
  - GJH+1+2: /saN-ʑíQ-ɕakɯ, saN-bjakɯ̥́-ɕakɯ/
  - Sen: /séN-ʑakɯ/
  - GSC: /icɕi-maN-ʑakɯ/
- Final-accented after all number groups; long counters specific suffixes such as ‑me (目; /mé/ '‑th'), ‑go (後; /ɡo/ 'later'), etc are also counted (CSL_−1). Eg: ‑chaku (着; /cɕákɯ/ '‑th arrival') and ‑nichime (日目; '‑th day'):
  - Ichi, JI: /iQ-cɕakɯ́, ʑɯR iQ-cɕakɯ́/; /icɕi-nicɕi-mé, ʑɯR icɕi-nicɕi-mé/
  - Jū: /ʑiQ-cɕakɯ́/; /ʑɯR-nicɕi-mé/
  - G−1, J−1: /haQ-cɕakɯ́, ʑɯR haQ-cɕakɯ́, ɾokɯ̥-cɕakɯ́, ʑɯR ɾokɯ̥-cɕakɯ́/; /ʑɯR hacɕi-nicɕi-mé, ʑɯR ɾokɯ-nicɕi-mé/
  - GNSS, JNSS: /ni-cɕakɯ́, ʑɯR ni-cɕakɯ́/; /ʑɯR ni-nicɕi-mé/
  - G+1, J+1: /kjɯR-cɕakɯ́, ʑɯR kjɯR-cɕakɯ́, joN-cɕakɯ́, ʑɯR joN-cɕakɯ́, nana-cɕakɯ́, ʑɯR nana-cɕakɯ́/; /ʑɯR kjɯR-nicɕi-mé, ʑɯR joN-nicɕi-mé, ʑɯR nana-nicɕi-mé/
  - GX0&Yo: /ɡo-cɕakɯ́/
    - JX0&Yo: /ʑɯR ɡo-cɕakɯ́ ~ ʑɯ́R ɡo-cɕakɯ ~ ʑɯ́R | ɡo-cɕakɯ́/; /ʑɯR ɡo-nicɕi-mé/
  - G0, J0: /saN-cɕakɯ́, ʑɯR saN-cɕakɯ́/; /ʑɯR saN-nicɕi-mé/
  - GJHX0: /hacɕi-ʑiQ-cɕakɯ́, haQ-pjakɯ̥-cɕakɯ́/; /hacɕi-ʑɯR-nicɕi-mé, haQ-pjakɯ-nicɕi-mé/
  - GJH+1+2: /saN-ʑiQ-cɕakɯ́, saN-bjakɯ̥-cɕakɯ́/; /saN-ʑɯR-nicɕi-mé, saN-bjakɯ-nicɕi-mé/
  - Sen: /seN-cɕakɯ́/; /seN-nicɕi-mé/
  - GSC: /icɕi-maN-cɕakɯ́/; /icɕi-maN-nicɕi-mé/
- Deaccenting after all number groups; long counters with specific suffixes such as ‑mae (前; /máe/ 'allotment'), etc are also counted (CSL_D). JX0&Yo may behave just like any other group, or forms two separable phrases with certain counters. Eg: ‑bai (倍; /bai ~ bái/ '‑fold'):
  - Ichi, JI: /icɕi-bai, ʑɯR icɕi-bai/
  - Jū: /ʑɯR-bai/
  - G−1, J−1: /hacɕi-bai, ʑɯR hacɕi-bai, ɾokɯ-bai, ʑɯR ɾokɯ-bai/
  - GNSS, JNSS: /ni-bai, ʑɯR ni-bai/
  - G+1, J+1: /kjɯR-bai, ʑɯR kjɯR-bai, joN-bai, ʑɯR joN-bai, nana-bai, ʑɯR nana-bai/
  - GX0&Yo: /ɡo-bai/
    - JX0&Yo: /ʑɯR ɡo-bai/
  - G0, J0: /saN-bai, ʑɯR saN-bai/
  - GJHX0: /hacɕi-ʑɯR-bai, haQ-pjakɯ-bai/
  - GJH+1+2: /saN-ʑɯR-bai, saN-bjakɯ-bai/
  - Sen: /seN-bai/
  - GSC: /icɕi-maN-bai/
- Preaccenting after GJHX0 and GJH+1+2, and deaccenting after all other number groups (CS_D_PnJ). Eg: ‑seN (選; /séN/ 'time being selected'):
  - Ichi: /iQ-seN/
    - JI: /ʑɯR iQ-seN/
  - Jū: /ʑiQ-seN/
  - G−1: /haQ-seN, ɾokɯ̥-seN/
    - J−1: /ʑɯR haQ-seN, ʑɯR ɾokɯ̥-seN/
  - GNSS: /ni-seN/
    - JNSS: /ʑɯR ni-seN/
  - G+1: /kjɯR-seN, joN-seN, nana-seN/
    - J+1: /ʑɯR kjɯR-seN, ʑɯR joN-seN, ʑɯR nana-seN/
  - GX0&Yo: /ɡo-seN/
    - JX0&Yo: /ʑɯR ɡo-seN/
  - G0: /saN-seN/
    - J0: /ʑɯR saN-seN ~ ʑɯR sáN-seN/
  - GJHX0: /hacɕi-ʑíQ-seN, haQ-pjakɯ̥́-seN/
  - GJH+1+2: /saN-ʑíQ-seN, saN-bjakɯ̥́-seN/
  - Sen: /seN-seN/
  - GSC: /icɕi-maN-seN/
- Preaccenting after GJHX0 and GJH+1+2, preaccenting or deaccenting after JI, J−1, JNSS, J+1, J0 and JX0&Yo, and deaccenting after all other number groups (CS_D_PJnJ). Eg: ‑seN (戦; 'battle'):
  - Ichi: /iQ-seN/
    - JI: /ʑɯR iQ-seN ~ ʑɯR íQ-seN/
  - Jū: /ʑiQ-seN/
  - G−1: /haQ-seN, ɾokɯ̥-seN/
    - J−1: /ʑɯR haQ-seN ~ ʑɯR háQ-seN, ʑɯR ɾokɯ̥-seN ~ ʑɯR ɾokɯ̥́-seN/
  - GNSS: /ni-seN/
    - JNSS: /ʑɯR ni-seN ~ ʑɯR ní-seN/
  - G+1: /kjɯR-seN, joN-seN, nana-seN/
    - J+1: /ʑɯR kjɯR-seN ~ ʑɯR kjɯ́R-seN, ʑɯR joN-seN ~ ʑɯR jóN-seN, ʑɯR nana-seN ~ ʑɯR naná-seN/
  - GX0&Yo: /ɡo-seN/
    - JX0&Yo: /ʑɯR ɡo-seN ~ ʑɯ́R ɡo-seN ~ ʑɯ́R | ɡó-seN/
  - G0: /saN-seN/
    - J0: /ʑɯR saN-seN ~ ʑɯR sáN-seN/
  - GJHX0: /hacɕi-ʑíQ-seN, haQ-pjakɯ̥́-seN/
  - GJH+1+2: /saN-ʑíQ-seN, saN-bjakɯ̥́-seN/
  - Sen: /seN-seN/
  - GSC: /icɕi-maN-seN/

===== Long counters =====
Long counters mostly follow the regular rules of long heads, in that originally unaccented, final- or initial-accented counters, or medially penultimate-accented counters with special final morae, except counters with specific suffixes such as ‑me (目; /mé/ '‑th'), ‑go (後; /ɡo/ 'later'), ‑mae (前; /máe/ 'allotment'), etc become initial-accented before all number groups; some short counters are also counted (CSL_+1):

- ‑jikan (時間; /ʑikaN/ 'hour'):
  - Ichi, JI: /icɕi-ʑíkaN, ʑɯR icɕi-ʑíkaN/
  - Jū: /ʑɯR-ʑíkaN/
  - G−1, J−1: /hacɕi-ʑíkaN, ʑɯR hacɕi-ʑíkaN, ɾokɯ-ʑíkaN, ʑɯR ɾokɯ-ʑíkaN/
  - GNSS, JNSS: /ni-ʑíkaN, ʑɯR ni-ʑíkaN/
  - G+1, J+1: /kjɯR-ʑíkaN, ʑɯR kjɯR-ʑíkaN, joN-ʑíkaN, ʑɯR joN-ʑíkaN, nana-ʑíkaN, ʑɯR nana-ʑíkaN/
  - GX0&Yo, JX0&Yo: /ɡo-ʑíkaN, ʑɯR ɡo-ʑíkaN/
  - G0, J0: /saN-ʑíkaN, ʑɯR saN-ʑíkaN/
  - GJHX0: /hacɕi-ʑɯR-ʑíkaN, haQ-pjakɯ-ʑíkaN/
  - GJH+1+2: /saN-ʑɯR-ʑíkaN, saN-bjakɯ-ʑíkaN/
  - Sen: /seN-ʑíkaN/
  - GSC: /icɕi-maN-ʑíkaN/
- ‑fukuro/‑pukuro (袋; /ɸɯ̥kɯɾó/ 'bag'):
  - Ichi, JI: /icɕi-ɸɯ̥́kɯɾo, ʑɯR icɕi-ɸɯ̥́kɯɾo/
  - Jū: /ʑiQ-pɯ̥́kɯɾo/
  - G−1, J−1: /hacɕi-ɸɯ̥́kɯɾo, ʑɯR hacɕi-ɸɯ̥́kɯɾo, ɾokɯ-ɸɯ̥́kɯɾo, ʑɯR ɾokɯ-ɸɯ̥́kɯɾo/
  - GNSS, JNSS: /ni-ɸɯ̥́kɯɾo, ʑɯR ni-ɸɯ̥́kɯɾo/
  - G+1, J+1: /kjɯR-ɸɯ̥́kɯɾo, ʑɯR kjɯR-ɸɯ̥́kɯɾo, joN-ɸɯ̥́kɯɾo, ʑɯR joN-ɸɯ̥́kɯɾo, nana-ɸɯ̥́kɯɾo, ʑɯR nana-ɸɯ̥́kɯɾo/
  - GX0&Yo, JX0&Yo: /ɡo-ɸɯ̥́kɯɾo, ʑɯR ɡo-ɸɯ̥́kɯɾo/
  - G0, J0: /saN-ɸɯ̥́kɯɾo, ʑɯR saN-ɸɯ̥́kɯɾo/
  - GJHX0: /hacɕi-ʑiQ-pɯ̥́kɯɾo, haQ-pjakɯ-ɸɯ̥́kɯɾo/
  - GJH+1+2: /saN-ʑiQ-pɯ̥́kɯɾo, saN-bjakɯ-ɸɯ̥́kɯɾo/
  - Sen: /seN-ɸɯ̥́kɯɾo/
  - GSC: /icɕi-maN-ɸɯ̥́kɯɾo/
- ‑setai (世帯; /setái ~ sétai/ 'household'):
  - Ichi, JI: /icɕi̥-sétai → iQ-sétai, ʑɯR icɕi̥-sétai → ʑɯR iQ-sétai/
  - Jū: /ʑiQ-sétai/
  - G−1, J−1: /hacɕi̥-sétai → haQ-sétai, ʑɯR hacɕi̥-sétai → ʑɯR haQ-sétai, ɾokɯ̥-sétai, ʑɯR ɾokɯ̥-sétai/
  - GNSS, JNSS: /ni-sétai, ʑɯR ni-sétai/
  - G+1, J+1: /kjɯR-sétai, ʑɯR kjɯR-sétai, joN-sétai, ʑɯR joN-sétai, nana-sétai, ʑɯR nana-sétai/
  - GX0&Yo, JX0&Yo: /ɡo-sétai, ʑɯR ɡo-sétai/
  - G0, J0: /saN-sétai, ʑɯR saN-sétai/
  - GJHX0: /hacɕi-ʑiQ-sétai, haQ-pjakɯ̥-sétai/
  - GJH+1+2: /saN-ʑiQ-sétai, saN-bjakɯ̥-sétai/
  - Sen: /seN-sétai/
  - GSC: /icɕi-maN-sétai/

===== Recent-loanword counters =====
Older bimoraic recent-loanword counters, such as kiro, ton, miri, doru, behave like CS_P counters:

- ‑kiro (キロ; /kíɾo/ 'kilo'):
  - Ichi, JI: /icɕí̥-kiɾo, ʑɯR icɕí̥-kiɾo/
  - Jū: /ʑíQ-kiɾo/
  - G−1, J−1: /hacɕí̥-kiɾo, ʑɯR hacɕí̥-kiɾo, ɾóQ-kiɾo, ʑɯR ɾóQ-kiɾo/
  - GNSS, JNSS: /ní-kiɾo, ʑɯR ní-kiɾo/
  - G+1, J+1: /kjɯ́R-kiɾo, ʑɯR kjɯ́R-kiɾo, jóN-kiɾo, ʑɯR jóN-kiɾo, naná-kiɾo, ʑɯR naná-kiɾo/
  - GX0&Yo: /ɡó-kiɾo/
    - JX0&Yo: /ʑɯ́R ɡo-kiɾo ~ ʑɯ́R | ɡó-kiɾo/
  - G0, J0: /sáN-kiɾo, ʑɯR sáN-kiɾo/
  - GJHX0: /hacɕi-ʑíQ-kiɾo, haQ-pjáQ-kiɾo/
  - GJH+1+2: /saN-ʑíQ-kiɾo, saN-bjáQ-kiɾo/
  - Sen: /séN-kiɾo/
  - GSC: /icɕi-maN-kiɾo/

Trimoraic and quadrimoraic, as well as newer bimoraic counters, behave like CL_+1 counters:

- ‑won (ウォン; /wóN/ 'won'):
  - Ichi, JI: /icɕi-wóN, ʑɯR icɕi-wóN/
  - Jū: /ʑɯR-wóN/
  - G−1, J−1: /hacɕi-wóN, ʑɯR hacɕi-wóN, ɾokɯ-wóN, ʑɯR ɾokɯ-wóN/
  - GNSS, JNSS: /ni-wóN, ʑɯR ni-wóN/
  - G+1, J+1: /kjɯR-wóN, ʑɯR kjɯR-wóN, joN-wóN, ʑɯR joN-wóN, nana-wóN, ʑɯR nana-wóN/
  - GX0&Yo, JX0&Yo: /ɡo-wóN, ʑɯR ɡo-wóN/
  - G0, J0: /saN-wóN, ʑɯR saN-wóN/
  - GJHX0: /hacɕi-ʑɯR-wóN, haQ-pjakɯ-wóN/
  - GJH+1+2: /saN-ʑɯR-wóN, saN-bjakɯ-wóN/
  - Sen: /seN-wóN/
  - GSC: /icɕi-maN-wóN/
- ‑sento (セント; /séNto/ 'cent'):
  - Ichi, JI: /iQ-séNto, ʑɯR iQ-séNto/
  - Jū: /ʑiQ-séNto/
  - G−1, J−1: /haQ-séNto, ʑɯR haQ-séNto, ɾokɯ̥-séNto, ʑɯR ɾokɯ̥-séNto/
  - GNSS, JNSS: /ni-séNto, ʑɯR ni-séNto/
  - G+1, J+1: /kjɯR-séNto, ʑɯR kjɯR-séNto, joN-séNto, ʑɯR joN-séNto, nana-séNto, ʑɯR nana-séNto/
  - GX0&Yo, JX0&Yo: /ɡo-séNto, ʑɯR ɡo-séNto/
  - G0, J0: /saN-séNto, ʑɯR saN-séNto/
  - GJHX0: /hacɕi-ʑiQ-séNto, haQ-pjakɯ̥-séNto/
  - GJH+1+2: /saN-ʑiQ-séNto, saN-bjakɯ̥-séNto/
  - Sen: /seN-séNto/
  - GSC: /icɕi-maN-séNto/
- ‑mētoru (メートル; /meRtoɾɯ/ 'metre'):
  - Ichi, JI: /icɕi-méRtoɾɯ, ʑɯR icɕi-méRtoɾɯ/
  - Jū: /ʑɯR-méRtoɾɯ/
  - G−1, J−1: /hacɕi-méRtoɾɯ, ʑɯR hacɕi-méRtoɾɯ, ɾokɯ-méRtoɾɯ, ʑɯR ɾokɯ-méRtoɾɯ/
  - GNSS, JNSS: /ni-méRtoɾɯ, ʑɯR ni-méRtoɾɯ/
  - G+1, J+1: /kjɯR-méRtoɾɯ, ʑɯR kjɯR-méRtoɾɯ, joN-méRtoɾɯ, ʑɯR joN-méRtoɾɯ, nana-méRtoɾɯ, ʑɯR nana-méRtoɾɯ/
  - GX0&Yo, JX0&Yo: /ɡo-méRtoɾɯ, ʑɯR ɡo-méRtoɾɯ/
  - G0, J0: /saN-méRtoɾɯ, ʑɯR saN-méRtoɾɯ/
  - GJHX0: /hacɕi-ʑɯR-méRtoɾɯ, haQ-pjakɯ-méRtoɾɯ/
  - GJH+1+2: /saN-ʑɯR-méRtoɾɯ, saN-bjakɯ-méRtoɾɯ/
  - Sen: /seN-méRtoɾɯ/
  - GSC: /icɕi-maN-méRtoɾɯ/

Medial-accented quadrimoraic counters may also become initial-accented (CL_+1 ~ CL_M):

- ‑anpea (アンペア; /aNpéa/ 'ampere'):
  - Ichi, JI: /icɕi-áNpea ~ icɕi-aNpéa, ʑɯR icɕi-áNpea ~ ʑɯR icɕi-aNpéa/
  - Jū: /ʑɯR-áNpea ~ ʑɯR-aNpéa/
  - G−1, J−1: /hacɕi-áNpea ~ hacɕi-aNpéa, ʑɯR hacɕi-áNpea ~ ʑɯR hacɕi-aNpéa, ɾokɯ-áNpea ~ ɾokɯ-aNpéa, ʑɯR ɾokɯ-áNpea ~ ʑɯR ɾokɯ-aNpéa/
  - GNSS, JNSS: /ni-áNpea ~ ni-aNpéa, ʑɯR ni-áNpea ~ ʑɯR ni-aNpéa/
  - G+1, J+1: /kjɯR-áNpea ~ kjɯR-aNpéa, ʑɯR kjɯR-áNpea ~ ʑɯR kjɯR-aNpéa, joN-áNpea ~ joN-aNpéa, ʑɯR joN-áNpea ~ ʑɯR joN-aNpéa, nana-áNpea ~ nana-aNpéa, ʑɯR nana-áNpea ~ ʑɯR nana-aNpéa/
  - GX0&Yo, JX0&Yo: /ɡo-áNpea ~ ɡo-aNpéa, ʑɯR ɡo-áNpea ~ ʑɯR ɡo-aNpéa/
  - G0, J0: /saN-áNpea ~ saN-aNpéa, ʑɯR saN-áNpea ~ ʑɯR saN-aNpéa/
  - GJHX0: /hacɕi-ʑɯR-áNpea ~ hacɕi-ʑɯR-aNpéa, haQ-pjakɯ-áNpea ~ haQ-pjakɯ-aNpéa/
  - GJH+1+2: /saN-ʑɯR-áNpea ~ saN-ʑɯR-aNpéa, saN-bjakɯ-áNpea ~ saN-bjakɯ-aNpéa/
  - Sen: /seN-áNpea ~ seN-aNpéa/
  - GSC: /icɕi-maN-áNpea ~ icɕi-maN-aNpéa/

Quinquemoraic or longer counters retain their medial accent (CL_M):

- ‑kiromētoru (キロメートル; /kiɾoméRtoɾɯ/ 'kilometre'):
  - Ichi, JI: /icɕi̥-kiɾoméRtoɾɯ, ʑɯR icɕi̥-kiɾoméRtoɾɯ/
  - Jū: /ʑiQ-kiɾoméRtoɾɯ/
  - G−1, J−1: /hacɕi̥-kiɾoméRtoɾɯ, ʑɯR hacɕi̥-kiɾoméRtoɾɯ, ɾoQ-kiɾoméRtoɾɯ, ʑɯR ɾoQ-kiɾoméRtoɾɯ/
  - GNSS, JNSS: /ni-kiɾoméRtoɾɯ, ʑɯR ni-kiɾoméRtoɾɯ/
  - G+1, J+1: /kjɯR-kiɾoméRtoɾɯ, ʑɯR kjɯR-kiɾoméRtoɾɯ, joN-kiɾoméRtoɾɯ, ʑɯR joN-kiɾoméRtoɾɯ, nana-kiɾoméRtoɾɯ, ʑɯR nana-kiɾoméRtoɾɯ/
  - GX0&Yo, JX0&Yo: /ɡo-kiɾoméRtoɾɯ, ʑɯR ɡo-kiɾoméRtoɾɯ/
  - G0, J0: /saN-kiɾoméRtoɾɯ, ʑɯR saN-kiɾoméRtoɾɯ/
  - GJHX0: /hacɕi-ʑiQ-kiɾoméRtoɾɯ, haQ-pjaQ-kiɾoméRtoɾɯ/
  - GJH+1+2: /saN-ʑiQ-kiɾoméRtoɾɯ, saN-bjaQ-kiɾoméRtoɾɯ/
  - Sen: /seN-kiɾoméRtoɾɯ/
  - GSC: /icɕi-maN-kiɾoméRtoɾɯ/
- ‑heihō-senchimētoru (平方センチメートル; /heihoR seNcɕiméRtoɾɯ/ 'square centimetre'):
  - Ichi, JI: /icɕi̥-heihoR-seNcɕiméRtoɾɯ, ʑɯR icɕi̥-heihoR-seNcɕiméRtoɾɯ/
  - Jū: /ʑɯR-heihoR-seNcɕiméRtoɾɯ/
  - G−1, J−1: /hacɕi̥-heihoR-seNcɕiméRtoɾɯ, ʑɯR hacɕi̥-heihoR-seNcɕiméRtoɾɯ, ɾokɯ̥-heihoR-seNcɕiméRtoɾɯ, ʑɯR ɾokɯ̥-heihoR-seNcɕiméRtoɾɯ/
  - GNSS, JNSS: /ni-heihoR-seNcɕiméRtoɾɯ, ʑɯR ni-heihoR-seNcɕiméRtoɾɯ/
  - G+1, J+1: /kjɯR-heihoR-seNcɕiméRtoɾɯ, ʑɯR kjɯR-heihoR-seNcɕiméRtoɾɯ, joN-heihoR-seNcɕiméRtoɾɯ, ʑɯR joN-heihoR-seNcɕiméRtoɾɯ, nana-heihoR-seNcɕiméRtoɾɯ, ʑɯR nana-heihoR-seNcɕiméRtoɾɯ/
  - GX0&Yo, JX0&Yo: /ɡo-heihoR-seNcɕiméRtoɾɯ, ʑɯR ɡo-heihoR-seNcɕiméRtoɾɯ/
  - G0, J0: /saN-heihoR-seNcɕiméRtoɾɯ, ʑɯR saN-heihoR-seNcɕiméRtoɾɯ/
  - GJHX0: /hacɕi-ʑɯR-heihoR-seNcɕiméRtoɾɯ, haQ-pjakɯ̥-heihoR-seNcɕiméRtoɾɯ/
  - GJH+1+2: /saN-ʑɯR-heihoR-seNcɕiméRtoɾɯ, saN-bjakɯ̥-heihoR-seNcɕiméRtoɾɯ/
  - Sen: /seN-heihoR-seNcɕiméRtoɾɯ/
  - GSC: /icɕi-maN-heihoR-seNcɕiméRtoɾɯ/

==== Indefinites ====
When nan‑ and iku‑ prefix a short counter directly, they tend to form an initial-accented compound. Their behavior usually coincides with that of the numeral san, with some exceptions. Note that for iku‑, the nucleus is generally i, not ku. In the following examples, gojū san may be mentioned if san cannot occur with the counter in isolation, or the former has a different nucleus from the latter:

- ‑en (円; /éN/ 'yen'): /saN-eN ~ sáN-eN, ɡo-ʑɯR (|) sáN-eN, náN-eN, íkɯ-eN/
- ‑nin (人; /níN/ 'person'): /saN-níN, ɡo-ʑɯR (|) saN-níN ~ ɡo-ʑɯR (|) sáN-niN, náN-niN, íkɯ-niN/
- ‑nichi (日; /nícɕi/ 'day'): /ɡo-ʑɯR (|) saN-nicɕí ~ ɡo-ʑɯR (|) sáN-nicɕi, náN-nicɕi, íkɯ-nicɕi/
- CS_P_D0X0 counters:
  - ‑ban (番; /báN/ '‑th numerical label'): /saN-baN, ɡo-ʑɯR (|) saN-baN ~ ɡo-ʑɯR (|) sáN-baN, náN-baN, íkɯ-baN/
- CSL_−1 counters:
  - ‑chaku (着; /cɕákɯ/ 'occurrence'): /saN-cɕakɯ́ ~ sáN-cɕakɯ, naN-cɕakɯ́ ~ náN-cɕakɯ, ikɯ̥-cɕakɯ́ ~ íkɯ̥-cɕakɯ/
- CSL_D, CS_D_PnJ and CS_D_PJnJ counters:
  - ‑sen (戦; 'battle'): /saN-seN, naN-seN, ikɯ̥-seN/

Iku‑ behaves slightly different from nan‑ before:

- CS_P_+1S!+1 counters:
  - ‑kai (回; /kái/ 'occurrence'): /saN-kái, ɡo-ʑɯR (|) saN-kái ~ ɡo-ʑɯR (|) sáN-kai, naN-kái ~ náN-kai, íkɯ̥-kai/
- CS_P_−1SJ!+1!0!Sen counters:
  - ‑shaku/‑jaku (尺; /ɕakɯ́/): /sáN-ʑakɯ, náN-ʑakɯ, ɾokɯ̥-ɕakɯ́, íkɯ̥-ɕakɯ ~ ikɯ̥-ɕakɯ́/

When nan‑ and iku‑ prefix a long counter, they behave exactly like san:

- ‑nichime (日目; '‑th day'): /ɡo-ʑɯR (|) saN-nicɕi-mé, naN-nicɕi-mé, ikɯ-nicɕi-mé/
- ‑nichikan (日間; 'day'): /ɡo-ʑɯR (|) saN-nicɕí̥-kaN, naN-nicɕí̥-kaN, ikɯ-nicɕí̥-kaN/
- ‑jikan (時間; /ʑikaN/ 'hour'): /saN-ʑí-kaN, naN-ʑí-kaN, ikɯ-ʑí-kaN/
- ‑sento (セント; /séNto/ 'cent'): /saN-séNto, naN-séNto, ikɯ̥-séNto/
- ‑kiromētoru (キロメートル; /kiɾoméRtoɾɯ/ 'kilometre'): /saN-kiɾoméRtoɾɯ, naN-kiɾoméRtoɾɯ, ikɯ̥-kiɾoméRtoɾɯ/

Short sū‑ compounds are initial-accented if bimoraic, but unaccented if quadrimoraic, although younger speakers may make them all initial-accented:

- sūko (数個; /sɯ́R-ko/ 'a few things'), sūji (数次; /sɯ́R-ʑi/ 'a few times'), sūdo (数度; /sɯ́R-do/ 'a few times'), etc
- sūjitsu (数日; /sɯR-ʑitsɯ ~ ^{?}sɯ́R-ʑitsɯ/ 'a few days'), sūnen (数年; /sɯR-neN ~ ^{?}sɯ́R-neN/ 'a few years'), sūnin (数人; /sɯR-niN ~ ^{?}sɯ́R-niN/ 'a few people'), sūdan (数段; /sɯR-daN ~ sɯ́R-daN/ 'a few ranks'), etc
- sūkai (数回; /sɯR-kai/ 'a few times'), sūkoku (数刻; /sɯR-kokɯ/ 'a few hours'), sūfun (数分; /sɯR-ɸɯN/ 'a few minutes'), sūmai (数枚; /sɯR-mai/ 'a few flat pieces'), etc

Some examples of long sū‑ compounds: sūkasho (数ヶ所; /sɯR-káɕo/ 'a few places'), sūkagetsu (数ヶ月; /sɯR-káɡetsɯ/ 'a few months'), sūjikan (数時間; /sɯR-ʑíkaN/ 'a few hours'), sūshūkan (数週間; /sɯR-ɕɯ́RkaN/ 'a few weeks'), sūshurui (数種類; /sɯR-ɕɯ́ɾɯi/ 'a few types'), sūmētoru (数メートル; /sɯR-méRtoɾɯ/ 'a few metres'), etc

Nanjū, nanbyaku, ikujū, ikuhyaku, sūjū and sūhyaku work like GJH+1+2 numbers, and nanzen, nanman, ikusen, ikuman, sūsen, sūman, etc work like GSC numbers:

- ‑nin (人; /níN/ 'person'): /saN-ʑɯ́R-niN ~ sáN-ʑɯR-niN, naN-ʑɯ́R-niN ~ náN-ʑɯR-niN, ikɯ-ʑɯ́R-niN ~ íkɯ-ʑɯR-niN, sɯR-ʑɯ́R-niN ~ sɯ́R-ʑɯR-niN/
- ‑mei (名; /méi/ 'person'): /saN-bjakɯ́-mei ~ sáN-bjakɯ-mei, naN-bjakɯ́-mei ~ náN-bjakɯ-mei, ikɯ̥-hjakɯ́-mei ~ íkɯ̥-hjakɯ-mei, sɯR-hjakɯ́-mei ~ sɯ́R-hjakɯ-mei/
- ‑en (円; /éN/ 'yen'): /saN-zeN-eN, naN-zeN-eN, ikɯ̥-seN-eN, sɯR-seN-eN/

==== Sample list ====
The following is a non-exhaustive list of counters, the numeral sets that they follow, and their accentuation. The last column is for their grouping, which is based on the most regular pattern among all number–counter sequences. Here are the abbreviations used in the table:

- SJ: Sino-Japanese, namely:
  - 0 rei /ɾéi → ɾéR/, 1 ichi /icɕí/, 2 ni /ní/, 3 san /saN/, 4 shi /ɕí/, 5 go /ɡó ~ ^{†}ɡo/, 6 roku /ɾokɯ́/, 7 shichi /ɕi̥cɕí/, 8 hachi /hacɕí/, 9 kyū ~ ku /kjɯ́R ~ kɯ́ ~ ^{†}kɯ/, 10 jū /ʑɯ́R/
    - "9: SJ" means both kyū and ku are acceptable. Otherwise, only one variant is specified.
  - 11 jū ichi /ʑɯR icɕí/, 12 jū ni /ʑɯR ní/, 13 jū san /ʑɯ́R saN/, 15 jū go /ʑɯ́R ɡo/, 16 jū roku /ʑɯR ɾokɯ́/, 17 jū shichi /ʑɯR ɕi̥cɕí/, 18 jū hachi /ʑɯR hacɕí/, 19 jū kyū ~ jū ku /ʑɯR kjɯ́R ~ ʑɯ́R kɯ/
    - "19: SJ" means both jū kyū and jū ku are acceptable. Otherwise, only one variant is specified.
  - 20 nijū /ní-ʑɯR/, 30 sanjū /sáN-ʑɯR/, 40 shijū /ɕi-ʑɯ́R/, 50 gojū /ɡo-ʑɯ́R/, 60 nijū /ɾokɯ-ʑɯ́R/, 70 shichijū /ɕi̥cɕi-ʑɯ́R/, 80 hachijū /hacɕi-ʑɯ́R/, 90 kyūjū /kjɯ́R-ʑɯR/
  - 100 hyaku ~ ippyaku /hjakɯ́ ~ iQ-pjakɯ́/, 200 nihyaku /ni-hjakɯ́/, 300 sanbyaku /sáN-bjakɯ/, 400 shihyaku /ɕi̥-hjakɯ́/, 500 gohyaku /ɡo-hjakɯ́/, 600 ɾoppyaku /ɾoQ-pjakɯ́/, 700 shichihyaku /ɕi̥cɕi-hjakɯ́ ~ ɕi̥cɕí-hjakɯ/, 800 happyaku /haQ-pjakɯ́/, 900 kyūhyaku /kjɯ́R-hjakɯ/
  - 1,000 (is)sen /(iQ-)séN/, 2,000 nisen /ni-séN/, 3,000 sanzen /saN-zéN/, 5,000 gosen /ɡo-séN/, 6,000 rokusen /ɾokɯ̥-séN/, 7,000 shichisen /ɕi̥cɕi-séN/, 8,000 hassen /haQ-séN/, 9,000 kyūsen /kjɯR-séN/
- 10,000 ichiman /icɕi-máN/, 20,000 niman /ni-máN/, 30,000 sanman /saN-máN/, 50,000 goman /ɡo-máN/, 60,000 rokuman /ɾokɯ-máN/, 70,000 shichiman /ɕi̥cɕi-máN/, 80,000 hachiman /hacɕi-máN/, 90,000 kyūman /kjɯR-máN/
- 100,000 jūman /ʑɯR-máN/, 1,000,000 hyakuman /hjakɯ-máN/
  - han (半; 'half a(n)') /háN/
  - dai (第; '‑th') /dái/
- N: native, namely:
  - 1 hito /hi̥tó/, 2 futa /ɸɯ̥tá/, 3 mi /mí/, 4 yo(n) /jó(N)/, 5 itsu /ítsɯ/, 6 mu /mɯ́/, 7 nana /nána/, 8 ya /já/, 9 kokono /kokóno/, 10 to ~ tō /tó(R)/, 20 hata
    - "4: N" means both yon and yo are acceptable. Otherwise, only one variant is specified.
  - nan (何; 'how many ~ what ~ which ~ some') /náN/
  - iku (幾; '(how) many ~ some')
- NSJ: native + Sino-Japanese, namely:
  - 20 futajū /ɸɯ̥tá-ʑɯR/, 40 yonjū /jóN-ʑɯR/, 70 nanajū /naná-ʑɯR/
  - 200 futahyaku /ɸɯ̥tá-hjakɯ/, 400 yonhyaku /jóN-hjakɯ/, 700 nanahyaku /naná-hjakɯ/
  - 2,000 futasen /ɸɯ̥ta-séN/, 4,000 yonsen /joN-séN/, 7,000 nanasen /nana-séN/
  - 20,000 futaman /ɸɯ̥ta-máN/, 40,000 yonman /joN-máN/, 70,000 nanaman /nana-máN/
  - nanjū (何十; 'tens of') /náN-ʑɯR/
  - nanbyaku (何百; 'hundreds of') /náN-bjakɯ/
  - nanzen (何千; 'thousands of') /naN-zéN ~ náN-zeN/
  - ikujū (幾十; 'tens of') /íkɯ-ʑɯR/
  - ikuhyaku (幾百; 'hundreds of') /íkɯ̥-hjakɯ/
  - ikusen (幾千; 'thousands of') /ikɯ̥-séN ~ íkɯ̥-seN/
- E: English, namely:
  - 0 zero /zéɾo/, 1 wan /wáN/, 2 tsū /tsɯ́R/, 3 surī /sɯɾíR/, 4 fō /ɸóR/, 5 faibu /ɸáibɯ/, 6 shikkusu /ɕíQkɯ̥sɯ/, 7 sebun /sébɯN/, 8 eito /éito → éRto/, 9 nain /náiN/, 10 ten /téN/
- D: deaccenting
- P: preaccenting
- PP: the nucleus is the second mora before the counter, but without an obligatory leftward shift away from a special mora
- −1: final-accented
- −2: penultimate-accented
- −3: antepenultimate-accented
- −4: preantepenultimate-accented
- +1: initial-accented
- R: recessive (the counter does not affect the number's original accent)
- XD, XP, X−1, X−3, X+1: a number–counter sequence, labeled with D, P, −1, −3 or +1, following something else loosely, in a separable minor phrase
- ~: or
- *: the counter is completely regular to its group, but with additional irregular alternatives

Unless specified below, for a number that consists of a multiple of 10 greater than 10 itself and a numeral from 1 to 10, such as 21–29, 31–39, …, 101–110, 201–210, …, only the numeral forms a separable minor phrase with the counter, while the multiple of 10 behaves as shown in the previous sections on numbers. Dai only loosely combines with a number–counter sequence.

Counter	Original pronunciation	Numeral set	Accentuation	Group
āru (アール; 'are')	/áRɾɯ/	1; 2; 3; 5; 6; 8; 10; 11; 12; 13; 15; 16; 18; 20: SJ; 4; 14: (jū) yon; 7; 17: (jū) nana; 9; 19: (jū) kyū; nan	+1	CSL_+1
andā (アンダー; 'point under par')	/áNdaR/	1; 2; 3; 4; 5; 6; 7; 8; 9; 10: E; 11; 12; 13; 15; 16; 18; 20: SJ; 14; 17; 19: jū {yon;nana;kyū}; nan	+1	CSL_+1
anpea (アンペア; 'ampere')	/aNpéa/	1; 2; 3; 5; 6; 8; 10; 11; 12; 13; 15; 16; 18; 20: SJ; 4; 14: (jū) yon; 7; 17: (jū) nana; 9; 19: (jū) kyū; nan	+1 ~ −2	CSL_+1* ~ CL_M*
i (位; 'ordinal rank in performance ~ numerical place ~ departed soul')	/í/	1; 2; 5; 6; 8; 10; 11; 12; 13; 16; 18; 20: SJ; 3: /sáNi → sáNmi (Note: Chiefly in Buddhism for a low-ranking monk; and in Christianity for the Trinity.)/; 4; 14: (jū) yon; 7; 17: (jū) {nana;shichi}; 9; 19: (jū) kyū; nan	P	CS_P
i (位; 'ordinal rank in performance ~ numerical place ~ departed soul')	/í/	15: /ʑɯ́R ɡo-i ~ ʑɯ́R | ɡó-i/	XP	CS_P
i (位; 'ordinal rank in performance ~ numerical place ~ departed soul')	/í/	iku: /íkɯ-i/	PP	CS_P
i (位; 'ordinal feudal East-Asian courtier rank')	/í/	1st; 2nd; 4th; 5th; 6th; 7th; 8th; 10th: SJ; 3rd: /sáNi → sáNmi/; 9th: ku; nan	P	CS_P
iningu (イニング; 'inning')	/íniNɡɯ/	1; 2; 3; 5; 6; 8; 10; 11; 12; 13; 15; 16; 18; 20: SJ; 4; 14: (jū) yon; 7; 17: (jū) nana; 9; 19: (jū) kyū; nan	+1	CSL_+1
iro (色; 'color')	/iɾó/	1; 2; 3; 4; 7: N; 5; 6: N ~ SJ; 8: SJ; 9: kyū; 10: to ~ SJ	P	CS_P
inchi (インチ; 'inch')	/íNcɕi/	1; 2; 3; 5; 6; 8; 10; 11; 12; 13; 15; 16; 18; 20: SJ; 4; 14: (jū) yon; 7; 17: (jū) nana; 9; 19: (jū) kyū; nan	+1	CSL_+1
won (ウォン)	/wóN/	1; 2; 3; 5; 6; 8; 10; 11; 12; 13; 15; 16; 18; 20; 30; 50; 60; 80; 90; 100; 1,000; 10,000: SJ; 4; 14: (jū) yon; 7; 17: (jū) nana; 9; 19: (jū) kyū; 40; 70: NSJ; nan	+1	CSL_+1
e (重; 'layer')		1; 5; 6; 7; 9; 20; nan: N; 4: yo; 10: to	P	CS_P*
e (重; 'layer')		2; 3; 8: N	P ~ +1	CS_P*
e (重; 'layer')		iku: /íkɯ-e/	PP	CS_P*
en (円; 'yen')	/éN/	1; 2; 3; 6; 8: SJ; 1,000: sen	D ~ P	
en (円; 'yen')	/éN/	2; (Note: Chiefly in finance.) 4; nan: N; 5; 11; 12; 13; 16; 18; 50; 60; 70; 80; 200; 500; 600; 800: SJ; 7; 17: (jū) nana; 9; 19: (jū) kyū; 10: tō	P	
en (円; 'yen')	/éN/	10; 2,000; 3,000; 5,000; 6,000; 8,000; 9,000; 10,000; 20,000; 30,000; 40,000; 50,000; 60,000; 70,000; 80,000; 90,000; 100,000; 1,000,000: SJ; 100: hyaku; 4,000; 7,000: NSJ	D	
en (円; 'yen')	/éN/	14; 15: /ʑɯ́R {jo;ɡo}-eN ~ ʑɯ́R | {jó;ɡó}-eN/; 21; 22; 23; 24; 26; 28; 31; 32; 33; 34; 36; 38; 41; 42; 43; 44; 46; 48; 71; 72; 73; 74; 76; 78; 91; 92; 93; 94; 96; 98: /{ní;sáN;jóN;naná;kjɯ́R}-ʑɯR {icɕi;ni;saN;jo;ɾokɯ;hacɕi}-eN ~ {ní;sáN;jóN;naná;kjɯ́R}-ʑɯR | {icɕí;ní;sáN;jó;ɾokɯ́;hacɕí}-eN/; 51; 52; 53; 54; 56; 58; 61; 62; 63; 64; 66; 68; 81; 82; 83; 84; 86; 88: /{ɡo;ɾokɯ;hacɕi}-ʑɯR (|) {icɕí;ní;sáN;jó;ɾokɯ́;hacɕí}-eN/	XP	
en (円; 'yen')	/éN/	20; 30; 90; 300; 900: SJ; 40; 70; 400; 700: NSJ	P ~ R	
ōmu (オーム; 'ohm')	/óRmɯ/	1; 2; 3; 5; 6; 8; 10; 11; 12; 13; 15; 16; 18; 20: SJ; 4; 14: (jū) yon; 7; 17: (jū) nana; 9; 19: (jū) kyū; nan	+1	CSL_+1
oku (億; 'hundred million')	/ókɯ/	1; 2; 3; 5; 6; 8; 10; 11; 12; 13; 16; 18; 20; 30; 50; 60; 80; 90; 100; 200; 300; 500; 600; 800; 900: SJ; 4; 14: (jū) {yon;shi}; 7; 17: (jū) {nana;shichi}; 9; 19: (jū) kyū; 40; 70; 400; 700: NSJ ~ SJ; nan	P	CS_P
oku (億; 'hundred million')	/ókɯ/	15: /ʑɯ́R ɡo-okɯ ~ ʑɯ́R | ɡó-okɯ/	XP	CS_P
oku (億; 'hundred million')	/ókɯ/	{nan;iku} {10;100}: NSJ	P ~ R	CS_P
oku (億; 'hundred million')	/ókɯ/	iku	PP	CS_P
okutābu (オクターブ; 'octave')	/okɯ̥táRbɯ/	1; 2; 3; 5; 6; 8; 10; 11; 12; 13; 15; 16; 18; 20: SJ; 4; 14: (jū) yon; 7; 17: (jū) nana; 9; 19: (jū) kyū; nan	−3	CL_M
onsu (オンス; 'ounce')	/óNsɯ/	1; 2; 3; 5; 6; 8; 10; 11; 12; 13; 15; 16; 18; 20: SJ; 4; 14: (jū) yon; 7; 17: (jū) nana; 9; 19: (jū) kyū; nan	+1	CSL_+1
ka (日; 'ordinal day of the month ~ special ordinal day past the 200th ~ cardinal day') (Note: The first day of the month is /tsɯitacɕí/, which involves neither a numeral nor a counter.)		2: /ɸɯ̥tsɯ-ka/; 3: /miQ-ka/; 4: /joQ-ka/; 6: /mɯi-ka/; 8: /joR-ka/; 10; 210: /(ni-hjakɯ̥) toR-ka/; 20; 220: /(ni-{hjakɯ̥;hjakɯ}) hatsɯ̥-ka/	D	
ka (日; 'ordinal day of the month ~ special ordinal day past the 200th ~ cardinal day')		5: /itsɯ̥-{ka;ká}/; 7: /{nano;nanɯ}-{ka;ká}/	D ~ −1	
ka (日; 'ordinal day of the month ~ special ordinal day past the 200th ~ cardinal day')		9: /{kokono;kokonɯ}-ká/	−1	
ka (日; 'ordinal day of the month ~ special ordinal day past the 200th ~ cardinal day')		14: /ʑɯ́R (|) joQ-ka/; 24; 34; 44; 74; 94: /{ní;sáN;jóN;naná;kjɯ́R}-ʑɯR (|) joQ-ka/; 54; 64; 84: /{ɡo;ɾokɯ;hacɕi}-ʑɯR (|) joQ-ka/	XD	
nichi (日; 'ordinal day of the month')	/nícɕi/	11th; 12th: /ʑɯR {icɕi;ni}-nicɕí → ʑɯR {icɕi;ni}-Ncɕí/	−1	
nichi (日; 'ordinal day of the month')	/nícɕi/	13th: /{ʑɯR sáN-nicɕi → ʑɯR sáN-cɕi} ~ {ʑɯ́R saN-nicɕi → ʑɯ́R saN-cɕi}/; 30th: SJ	P ~ R	
nichi (日; 'ordinal day of the month')	/nícɕi/	15th; 19th: /{ʑɯ́R {ɡo;kɯ}-nicɕi → ʑɯ́R {ɡo;kɯ}-Ncɕi} ~ {ʑɯ́R | {ɡó;kɯ́}-nicɕi → ʑɯ́R | {ɡó;kɯ́}-Ncɕi} ~ {ʑɯR {ɡó;kɯ́}-nicɕi → ʑɯR {ɡó;kɯ́}-Ncɕi}/	XP ~ P	
nichi (日; 'ordinal day of the month')	/nícɕi/	16th; 17th; 18th: /{ʑɯR {ɾokɯ;ɕi̥cɕi;hacɕi}-nicɕí → ʑɯR {ɾokɯ;ɕi̥cɕi;hacɕi}-Ncɕí} ~ {ʑɯR {ɾokɯ́;ɕi̥cɕí;hacɕí}-nicɕi → ʑɯR {ɾokɯ́;ɕi̥cɕí;hacɕí}-Ncɕi}/	−1 ~ P	
nichi (日; 'ordinal day of the month')	/nícɕi/	21st; 22nd; 26th; 27th; 28th: /{ní-ʑɯR {icɕi;ni;ɾokɯ;ɕi̥cɕi;hacɕi}-nicɕi → ní-ʑɯR {icɕi;ni;ɾokɯ;ɕi̥cɕi;hacɕi}-Ncɕi} ~ {ní-ʑɯR | {icɕi;ni;ɾokɯ;ɕi̥cɕi;hacɕi}-nicɕí → ní-ʑɯR | {icɕi;ni;ɾokɯ;ɕi̥cɕi;hacɕi}-Ncɕí}/; 31st: /{sáN-ʑɯR icɕi-nicɕi → sáN-ʑɯR icɕi-Ncɕi} ~ {sáN-ʑɯR | icɕi-nicɕí → sáN-ʑɯR | icɕi-Ncɕí}/	X−1	
nichi (日; 'ordinal day of the month')	/nícɕi/	23rd: /{ní-ʑɯR saN-nicɕi → ní-ʑɯR saN-cɕi} ~ {ní-ʑɯR | sáN-nicɕi → ní-ʑɯR | sáN-cɕi}/; 25th; 29th: /{ní-ʑɯR {ɡo;kɯ}-nicɕi → ní-ʑɯR {ɡo;kɯ}-Ncɕi} ~ {ní-ʑɯR | {ɡó;kɯ́}-nicɕi → ní-ʑɯR | {ɡó;kɯ́}-Ncɕi}/	XP	
nichi (日; 'ordinal day of the month')	/nícɕi/	nan	P	
nichi (日; 'cardinal day ~ dai-prefixed ordinal day in general')	/nícɕi/	1; han: SJ; 11; 12: /ʑɯR {icɕi;ni}-nicɕí → ʑɯR {icɕi;ni}-Ncɕí/	−1	
nichi (日; 'cardinal day ~ dai-prefixed ordinal day in general')	/nícɕi/	13: /{ʑɯR sáN-nicɕi → ʑɯR sáN-cɕi} ~ {ʑɯ́R saN-nicɕi → ʑɯ́R saN-cɕi}/; 20; 30; 90; 300; 900: SJ; 40; 400: NSJ	P ~ R	
nichi (日; 'cardinal day ~ dai-prefixed ordinal day in general')	/nícɕi/	14: /ʑɯR jóN-nicɕi → ʑɯR jóN-cɕi/; 19: jū kyū; 70: NSJ; nan	P	
nichi (日; 'cardinal day ~ dai-prefixed ordinal day in general')	/nícɕi/	15; 19: /{ʑɯ́R {ɡo;kɯ}-nicɕi → ʑɯ́R {ɡo;kɯ}-Ncɕi} ~ {ʑɯ́R | {ɡó;kɯ́}-nicɕi → ʑɯ́R | {ɡó;kɯ́}-Ncɕi} ~ ʑɯR {ɡó;kɯ́}-nicɕi → ʑɯR {ɡó;kɯ́}-Ncɕi/	XP ~ P	
nichi (日; 'cardinal day ~ dai-prefixed ordinal day in general')	/nícɕi/	16; 18: /{ʑɯR {ɾokɯ;hacɕi}-nicɕí → ʑɯR {ɾokɯ;hacɕi}-Ncɕí} ~ {ʑɯR {ɾokɯ́;hacɕí}-nicɕi → ʑɯR {ɾokɯ́;hacɕí}-Ncɕi}/; 17: /{ʑɯR {ɕi̥cɕi;nana}-nicɕí → ʑɯR {ɕi̥cɕi;nana}-Ncɕí} ~ {ʑɯR {ɕi̥cɕí;naná}-nicɕi → ʑɯR {ɕi̥cɕí;naná}-Ncɕi}/; 100; 200; 400; 500; 700: /{({ni;ɕi̥;ɡo;ɕi̥cɕi}-)hjakɯ-nicɕí → ({ni;ɕi̥;ɡo;ɕicɕi}-)hjakɯ-Ncɕí} ~ {({ni;ɕi̥;ɡo;ɕicɕi}-)hjakɯ́-nicɕi → ({ni;ɕi̥;ɡo;ɕi̥cɕi}-)hjakɯ́-Ncɕi}/; 600; 800: /{{ɾoQ;haQ}-pjakɯ-nicɕí → {ɾoQ;haQ}-pjakɯ-Ncɕí} ~ {{ɾoQ;haQ}-pjakɯ́-nicɕi → {ɾoQ;haQ}-pjakɯ́-Ncɕi}/; 1,000: SJ	−1 ~ P	
nichi (日; 'cardinal day ~ dai-prefixed ordinal day in general')	/nícɕi/	21; 22; 26; 27; 28; 31; 32; 36; 37; 38; 41; 42; 46; 47; 48; 71; 72; 76; 77; 78; 91; 92; 96; 97; 98: /{{ní;sáN;jóN;naná;kjɯ́R}-ʑɯR {icɕi;ni;ɾokɯ;ɕi̥cɕi;hacɕi}-nicɕi → {ní;sáN;jóN;naná;kjɯ́R}-ʑɯR {icɕi;ni;ɾokɯ;ɕi̥cɕi;hacɕi}-Ncɕi} ~ {{ní;sáN;jóN;naná;kjɯ́R}-ʑɯR | {icɕi;ni;ɾokɯ;ɕi̥cɕi;hacɕi}-nicɕí → {ní;sáN;jóN;naná;kjɯ́R}-ʑɯR | {icɕi;ni;ɾokɯ;ɕi̥cɕi;hacɕi}-Ncɕí}/; 51; 52; 56; 57; 58; 61; 62; 66; 67; 68; 81; 82; 86; 87; 88: /{ɡo;ɾokɯ;hacɕi}-ʑɯR (|) {icɕi;ni;ɾokɯ;ɕi̥cɕi;hacɕi}-nicɕí → {ɡo;ɾokɯ;hacɕi}-ʑɯR (|) {icɕi;ni;ɾokɯ;ɕi̥cɕi;hacɕi}-Ncɕí/; dai {1;2;6;7;8;10;11;16;17;18}: /dái {(ʑɯR) {icɕi;ɾokɯ;ɕi̥cɕi;hacɕi};ni;ʑɯR}-nicɕi ~ dái | {(ʑɯR) {icɕi;ɾokɯ;ɕi̥cɕi;hacɕi};ni;ʑɯR}-nicɕí/	X−1	
nichi (日; 'cardinal day ~ dai-prefixed ordinal day in general')	/nícɕi/	23; 33; 43; 73; 93: /{{ní;sáN;jóN;naná;kjɯ́R}-ʑɯR saN-nicɕi → {ní;sáN;jóN;naná;kjɯ́R}-ʑɯR saN-cɕi} ~ {{ní;sáN;jóN;naná;kjɯ́R}-ʑɯR | {sáN-nicɕi;saN-nicɕí} → {ní;sáN;jóN;naná;kjɯ́R}-ʑɯR | {sáN-cɕi;saN-cɕí}}/; 27; 37; 47; 77; 97: /{{ní;sáN;jóN;naná;kjɯ́R}-ʑɯR nana-nicɕi → {ní;sáN;jóN;naná;kjɯ́R}-ʑɯR nana-Ncɕi} ~ {{ní;sáN;jóN;naná;kjɯ́R}-ʑɯR | {naná-nicɕi;nana-nicɕí} → {ní;sáN;jóN;naná;kjɯ́R}-ʑɯR | {naná-Ncɕi;nana-Ncɕí}}/; 53; 63; 83: /{ɡo;ɾokɯ;hacɕi}-ʑɯR (|) {sáN-nicɕi;saN-nicɕí} → {ɡo;ɾokɯ;hacɕi}-ʑɯR (|) {sáN-cɕi;saN-cɕí}/; 57; 67; 87: /{ɡo;ɾokɯ;hacɕi}-ʑɯR (|) {naná-nicɕi;nana-nicɕí} → {ɡo;ɾokɯ;hacɕi}-ʑɯR (|) {naná-Ncɕi;nana-Ncɕí}/	XP ~ X−1	
nichi (日; 'cardinal day ~ dai-prefixed ordinal day in general')	/nícɕi/	24; 34; 44; 74; 94: /{{ní;sáN;jóN;naná;kjɯ́R}-ʑɯR joN-nicɕi → {ní;sáN;jóN;naná;kjɯ́R}-ʑɯR joN-cɕi} ~ {{ní;sáN;jóN;naná;kjɯ́R}-ʑɯR | jóN-nicɕi → {ní;sáN;jóN;naná;kjɯ́R}-ʑɯR | jóN-cɕi}/; 25; 35; 45; 75; 95: /{{ní;sáN;jóN;naná;kjɯ́R}-ʑɯR ɡo-nicɕi → {ní;sáN;jóN;naná;kjɯ́R}-ʑɯR ɡo-Ncɕi} ~ {{ní;sáN;jóN;naná;kjɯ́R}-ʑɯR | ɡó-nicɕi → {ní;sáN;jóN;naná;kjɯ́R}-ʑɯR | ɡó-Ncɕi}/; 29; 39; 79; 99: /{{ní;sáN;naná;kjɯ́R}-ʑɯR kɯ-nicɕi → {ní;sáN;naná;kjɯ́R}-ʑɯR kɯ-Ncɕi} ~ {{ní;sáN;naná;kjɯ́R}-ʑɯR | kɯ́-nicɕi → {ní;sáN;naná;kjɯ́R}-ʑɯR | kɯ́-Ncɕi} ~ {ní;sáN;naná;kjɯ́R}-ʑɯR kjɯR-nicɕi ~ {ní;sáN;naná;kjɯ́R}-ʑɯR | kjɯ́R-nicɕi/; 49: /{{jóN-ʑɯR;ɕi-ʑɯ́R} kɯ-nicɕi → {jóN-ʑɯR;ɕi-ʑɯ́R} kɯ-Ncɕi} ~ {{jóN-ʑɯR;ɕi-ʑɯ́R} | kɯ́-nicɕi → {jóN-ʑɯR;ɕi-ʑɯ́R} | kɯ́-Ncɕi} ~ jóN-ʑɯR kjɯR-nicɕi ~ jóN-ʑɯR | kjɯ́R-nicɕi ~ {ɕi-ʑɯR (|) kɯ́-nicɕi → ɕi-ʑɯR (|) kɯ́-Ncɕi}/; 54; 64; 84: /{ɡo;ɾokɯ;hacɕi}-ʑɯR (|) jóN-nicɕi → {ɡo;ɾokɯ;hacɕi}-ʑɯR (|) jóN-cɕi/; 55; 65; 85: /{ɡo;ɾokɯ;hacɕi}-ʑɯR (|) ɡó-nicɕi → {ɡo;ɾokɯ;hacɕi}-ʑɯR (|) ɡó-Ncɕi/; 59; 69; 89: /{{ɡo;ɾokɯ;hacɕi}-ʑɯR (|) kɯ́-nicɕi → {ɡo;ɾokɯ;hacɕi}-ʑɯR (|) kɯ́-Ncɕi} ~ {ɡo;ɾokɯ;hacɕi}-ʑɯR (|) kjɯ́R-nicɕi/; dai {3;4;5;12;13;14;20}: /dái {(ʑɯR) {saN;joN};ɡo;ʑɯR ni;ni-ʑɯR}-nicɕi ~ dái | {(ʑɯR) {sáN;jóN};ɡó;ʑɯR ní;ni-ʑɯ́R}-nicɕi/; dai 9: /dái {kɯ;kjɯR}-nicɕi ~ dái | {kɯ́;kjɯ́R}-nicɕi/; dai 15: /dái ʑɯR ɡo-nicɕi ~ dái | ʑɯ́R ɡo-nicɕi ~ dái | ʑɯ́R | ɡó-nicɕi/; dai 19: /dái ʑɯR kɯ-nicɕi ~ dái | ʑɯ́R kɯ-nicɕi ~ dái | ʑɯ́R | kɯ́-nicɕi ~ dái ʑɯR kjɯR-nicɕi ~ dái | ʑɯR kjɯ́R-nicɕi/	XP	
nichi (日; 'cardinal day ~ dai-prefixed ordinal day in general')	/nícɕi/	40; 50; 60; 70; 80: SJ	P ~ −1 ~ D	
nichi (日; 'cardinal day ~ dai-prefixed ordinal day in general')	/nícɕi/	10,000: SJ	D	
kame (日目; 'ordinal day in general')		2nd: /ɸɯ̥tsɯ-ka-mé/; 3rd: /miQ-ka-mé/; 4th; 14th: /(ʑɯR) joQ-ka-mé/; 5th: /itsɯ̥-ka-mé/; 6th: /mɯi-ka-mé/; 7th: /nano-ka-mé/; 8th: /joR-ka-mé/; 9th: N; 10th: tō; 20th: /hatsɯ̥-ka-mé/	−1	CSL_−1
kame (日目; 'ordinal day in general')		24th; 34th; 44th; 74th; 94th: /{ní;sáN;jóN;naná;kjɯ́R}-ʑɯR joQ-ka-me ~ {ní;sáN;jóN;naná;kjɯ́R}-ʑɯR | joQ-ka-mé/; 54th; 64th; 84th: /{ɡo;ɾokɯ;hacɕi}-ʑɯR (|) joQ-ka-mé/	X−1	CSL_−1
nichime (日目; 'ordinal day in general')		1st; 11th; 12th; 13th; 15th; 16th; 18th; 19th; 20th; 30th; 50th; 60th; 80th; 90th; 100th; 1,000th; 10,000th: SJ; 14th: jū yon; 17th: jū {shichi;nana}; 40th; 70th: NSJ; nan	−1	CSL_−1
nichime (日目; 'ordinal day in general')		21st; 22nd; 23rd; 24th; 25th; 26th; 28th; 31st; 32nd; 33rd; 34th; 35th; 36th; 38th; 41st; 42nd; 43rd; 44th; 45th; 46th; 48th; 71st; 72nd; 73rd; 74th; 75th; 76th; 78th; 91st; 92nd; 93rd; 94th; 95th; 96th; 98th: /{ní;sáN;jóN;naná;kjɯ́R}-ʑɯR {icɕi;ni;saN;joN;ɡo;ɾokɯ;hacɕi}-nicɕi-me ~ {ní;sáN;jóN;naná;kjɯ́R}-ʑɯR | {icɕi;ni;saN;joN;ɡo;ɾokɯ;hacɕi}-nicɕi-mé/; 27th; 37th; 47th; 77th; 97th: /{ní;sáN;jóN;naná;kjɯ́R}-ʑɯR {ɕi̥cɕi;nana}-nicɕi-me ~ {ní;sáN;jóN;naná;kjɯ́R}-ʑɯR | {ɕi̥cɕi;nana}-nicɕi-mé/; 29th; 39th; 49th; 79th; 99th: /{ní;sáN;jóN;naná;kjɯ́R}-ʑɯR {kɯ;kjɯR}-nicɕi-me ~ {ní;sáN;jóN;naná;kjɯ́R}-ʑɯR | {kɯ;kjɯR}-nicɕi-mé/; 51st; 52nd; 53rd; 54th; 55th; 56th; 58th; 61st; 62nd; 63rd; 64th; 65th; 66th; 68th; 81st; 82nd; 83rd; 84th; 85th; 86th; 88th: /{ɡo;ɾokɯ;hacɕi}-ʑɯR (|) {icɕi;ni;saN;joN;ɡo;ɾokɯ;hacɕi}-nicɕi-mé/; 57th; 67th; 87th: /{ɡo;ɾokɯ;hacɕi}-ʑɯR (|) {ɕi̥cɕi;nana}-nicɕi-mé/; 59th; 69th; 89th: /{ɡo;ɾokɯ;hacɕi}-ʑɯR (|) {kɯ;kjɯR}-nicɕi-mé/	X−1	CSL_−1
kakan (日間; 'cardinal day')		2: /ɸɯ̥tsɯ-ká-kaN/; 3: /miQ-ká-kaN/; 4; 14: /(ʑɯR) joQ-ká-kaN/; 5: /itsɯ̥-ká-kaN/; 6: /mɯi-ká-kaN/; 7: /nano-ká-kaN/; 8: /joR-ká-kaN/; 9: N; 10: tō; 20: /hatsɯ̥-ká-kaN/	+1	CSL_+1
kakan (日間; 'cardinal day')		24; 34; 44; 74; 94: /{ní;sáN;jóN;naná;kjɯ́R}-ʑɯR joQ-ka-kaN ~ {ní;sáN;jóN;naná;kjɯ́R}-ʑɯR | joQ-ká-kaN/; 54; 64; 84: /{ɡo;ɾokɯ;hacɕi}-ʑɯR (|) joQ-ká-kaN/	X+1	CSL_+1
nichikan (日間; 'cardinal day')		1; 11; 12; 13; 15; 16; 18; 19; 30; 50; 60; 80; 90; 100; 1,000; 10,000: SJ; 14th: jū yon; 17th: jū {shichi;nana}; 40; 70: NSJ; nan	−3	CL_M
nichikan (日間; 'cardinal day')		21; 22; 23; 24; 25; 26; 28; 31; 32; 33; 34; 35; 36; 38; 41; 42; 43; 44; 45; 46; 48; 71; 72; 73; 74; 75; 76; 78; 91; 92; 93; 94; 95; 96; 98: /{ní;sáN;jóN;naná;kjɯ́R}-ʑɯR {icɕi;ni;saN;joN;ɡo;ɾokɯ;hacɕi}-nicɕi̥-kaN ~ {ní;sáN;jóN;naná;kjɯ́R}-ʑɯR | {icɕi;ni;saN;joN;ɡo;ɾokɯ;hacɕi}-nicɕí̥-kaN/; 27; 37; 47; 77; 97: /{ní;sáN;jóN;naná;kjɯ́R}-ʑɯR {ɕi̥cɕi;nana}-nicɕi̥-kaN ~ {ní;sáN;jóN;naná;kjɯ́R}-ʑɯR | {ɕi̥cɕi;nana}-nicɕí̥-kaN/; 29; 39; 49; 79; 99: /{ní;sáN;jóN;naná;kjɯ́R}-ʑɯR {kɯ;kjɯR}-nicɕi̥-kaN ~ {ní;sáN;jóN;naná;kjɯ́R}-ʑɯR | {kɯ;kjɯR}-nicɕí̥-kaN/; 51; 52; 53; 54; 55; 56; 58; 61; 62; 63; 64; 65; 66; 68; 81; 82; 83; 84; 85; 86; 88: /{ɡo;ɾokɯ;hacɕi}-ʑɯR (|) {icɕi;ni;saN;joN;ɡo;ɾokɯ;hacɕi}-nicɕí̥-kaN/; 57; 67; 87: /{ɡo;ɾokɯ;hacɕi}-ʑɯR (|) {ɕi̥cɕi;nana}-nicɕí̥-kaN/; 59; 69; 89: /{ɡo;ɾokɯ;hacɕi}-ʑɯR (|) {kɯ;kjɯR}-nicɕí̥-kaN/	X−3	CL_M
ka (課; 'lesson ~ company section')	/ká/	1; 11: /(ʑɯR) íQ-ka/; 2; 3; 5; 12; 13: SJ; 4; 14: (jū) yon; 6; 16: /(ʑɯR) ɾóQ-ka/; 7; 17: (jū) nana; 8; 18: /(ʑɯR) hacɕí̥-ka/; 9; 19: (jū) kyū; 10; 20: /(ni-){ʑíQ;ʑɯ́Q}-ka/; nan	P	CS_P
ka (課; 'lesson ~ company section')	/ká/	15: /ʑɯ́R ɡo-ka ~ ʑɯ́R | ɡó-ka/	XP	CS_P
kai (階; 'storey')	/kái/	1: /iQ-kai/; 2; 5; 1,000; 10,000: SJ; 3: /saN-ɡai/; 6: /ɾoQ-kai/; 7: N ~ SJ; 8: /hacɕi̥-kai → haQ-kai/; 10; 20; 30; 40; 50; 60; 70; 80; 90: /({ni;saN;joN;ɡo;ɾokɯ;nana;hacɕi;kjɯR}-){ʑiQ;ʑɯQ}-kai/; 100: /hjaQ-kai/	D	CSL_D*
kai (階; 'storey')	/kái/	4; 14: (jū) yon; 9; 19: (jū) kyū; 11: /ʑɯR {iQ;íQ}-kai/; 12: SJ; 13: /ʑɯR {saN;sáN}-ɡai/; 16: /ʑɯR {ɾoQ;ɾóQ}-kai/; 17: jū {nana;shichi}; 18: /{ʑɯR hacɕi̥-kai → ʑɯR haQ-kai} ~ {ʑɯR hacɕí̥-kai → ʑɯR háQ-kai}/; nan: /{naN-kai → naN-ɡai} ~ {náN-kai → náN-ɡai}/	D ~ P	CSL_D*
kai (階; 'storey')	/kái/	15: /{ʑɯR;ʑɯ́R} ɡo-kai ~ ʑɯ́R | ɡó-kai/	D ~ XP	CSL_D*
kai (階; 'storey')	/kái/	iku: /ikɯ̥-kai ~ íkɯ̥-kai/	D ~ PP	CSL_D*
kaikyū (階級; 'military rank ~ weight class')	/kaikjɯR/	1; 1: /(ʑɯR) icɕi̥-káikjɯR → (ʑɯR) iQ-káikjɯR/; 2; 3; 5; 12; 13; 15: SJ; 4; 14: (jū) yon; 6; 16: /(ʑɯR) ɾokɯ̥-káikjɯR → (ʑɯR) ɾoQ-káikjɯR/; 7; 17: (jū) nana; 8; 18: /(ʑɯR) hacɕi̥-káikjɯR/; 9; 19: (jū) kyū; 10; 20: /(ni-){ʑiQ;ʑɯQ}-káikjɯR/; nan	+1	CSL_+1
kai (回; 'occurrence ~ sport match ~ game round')	/kái/	1: /iQ-kái/; 2; 3; 5: SJ; 6: /ɾoQ-kái/; 8: /hacɕi̥-kái → haQ-kái/; 10: /{ʑiQ;ʑɯQ}-kái/; 100: /hjaQ-kái/	+1	CS_P_+1SJ* ~ CS_P_+1S!+1*
kai (回; 'occurrence ~ sport match ~ game round')	/kái/	4; 14: (jū) yon; 7; 17: (jū) nana; 9; 19: (jū) kyū; 11: /ʑɯR {iQ-kái;íQ-kai}/; 12; 13: SJ; 16: /ʑɯR {ɾoQ-kái;ɾóQ-kai}/; 18: /{ʑɯR hacɕi̥-kái → ʑɯR haQ-kái} ~ {ʑɯR hacɕí̥-kai → ʑɯR háQ-kai}/; 1,000: sen; nan	+1 ~ P	CS_P_+1SJ* ~ CS_P_+1S!+1*
kai (回; 'occurrence ~ sport match ~ game round')	/kái/	15: /ʑɯ́R ɡo-kai ~ ʑɯ́R | ɡo-kái/	X+1	CS_P_+1SJ* ~ CS_P_+1S!+1*
kai (回; 'occurrence ~ sport match ~ game round')	/kái/	20; 30; 40; 90: /{{ni;saN;joN;kjɯR}-{ʑíQ;ʑɯ́Q};{ní;sáN;jóN;kjɯ́R}-{ʑiQ;ʑɯQ}}-kai/	P ~ R	CS_P_+1SJ* ~ CS_P_+1S!+1*
kai (回; 'occurrence ~ sport match ~ game round')	/kái/	23, 33, 43, 73, 93: /{ní;sáN;jóN;naná;kjɯ́R}-ʑɯR saN-kai ~ {ní;sáN;jóN;naná;kjɯ́R}-ʑɯR | {saN-kái;sáN-kai}/; 53, 63, 83: /{ɡo;ɾokɯ;hacɕi}-ʑɯR (|) {saN-kái;sáN-kai}/	X+1 ~ XP	CS_P_+1SJ* ~ CS_P_+1S!+1*
kai (回; 'occurrence ~ sport match ~ game round')	/kái/	50; 60; 70; 80: /{ɡo;ɾokɯ;nana;hacɕi}-{ʑíQ;ʑɯ́Q}-kai/	P	CS_P_+1SJ* ~ CS_P_+1S!+1*
kai (回; 'occurrence ~ sport match ~ game round')	/kái/	10,000: SJ	D	CS_P_+1SJ* ~ CS_P_+1S!+1*
kaiki (回忌; 'year elapsed after the date of death') (Note: Except for 1, every other number represents 1 less than the nominal value. For example, "3" actually means 2 years, "7" means 6, etc.)	/káiki ~ kaiki/	1: /iQ-káiki/ (Note: Alternatively; isshūki (一周忌; /iQ-ɕɯ́Rki/).); 3; 13: SJ; 7; 17: (jū) {shichi;nana}; nan	+1	CSL_+1
kairi (海里; 'sea mile')	/káiɾi/	1; 11: /(ʑɯR) icɕi̥-káiɾi/; 2; 3; 5; 12; 13; 15: SJ; 4; 14: (jū) yon; 6; 16: /(ʑɯR) ɾoQ-káiɾi/; 7; 17: (jū) nana; 8; 18: /(ʑɯR) hacɕi̥-káiɾi/; 9; 19: (jū) kyū; 10; 20: /(ni-){ʑiQ;ʑɯQ}-káiɾi/; nan	+1	CSL_+1
kaku (角; 'one-tenth coin ~ angle')	/kákɯ ~ kakɯ́/	1: /iQ-{kakɯ́;kakɯ}/	−1 ~ D	CS_P_−1SJ!+1!0!Sen*
kaku (角; 'one-tenth coin ~ angle')	/kákɯ ~ kakɯ́/	2; 5; 7: SJ; 4: /ɕi̥-kakɯ́/; 6: /ɾoQ-kakɯ́/; 8: /hacɕi̥-kakɯ́ → haQ-kakɯ́/; 10: /{ʑiQ;ʑɯQ}-kakɯ́/	−1	CS_P_−1SJ!+1!0!Sen*
kaku (角; 'one-tenth coin ~ angle')	/kákɯ ~ kakɯ́/	3: SJ; 4: yon; 9: kyū; nan	P	CS_P_−1SJ!+1!0!Sen*
kaku (角; 'one-tenth coin ~ angle')	/kákɯ ~ kakɯ́/	7: N	P ~ −1	CS_P_−1SJ!+1!0!Sen*
kaku (角; 'one-tenth coin ~ angle')	/kákɯ ~ kakɯ́/	iku: /íkɯ̥-kakɯ ~ ikɯ̥-kakɯ́/	PP ~ −1	CS_P_−1SJ!+1!0!Sen*
kagetsu (ヶ月; 'cardinal month')		1; 11: /(ʑɯR) iQ-káɡetsɯ/; 2; 3; 5; 12; 13; 15: SJ; 4; 14: (jū) yon; 6; 16: /(ʑɯR) ɾoQ-káɡetsɯ/; 7; 17: (jū) nana; 8; 18: /(ʑɯR) hacɕi̥-káɡetsɯ → (ʑɯR) haQ-káɡetsɯ/; 9; 19: (jū) kyū; 10; 20: /(ni-){ʑiQ;ʑɯQ}-káɡetsɯ/; nan	+1	CSL_+1
kakoku (ヶ国; 'cardinal country')		1; 11: /(ʑɯR) iQ-kákokɯ/; 2; 3; 5; 12; 13; 15: SJ; 4; 14: (jū) yon; 6; 16: /(ʑɯR) ɾoQ-kákokɯ/; 7; 17: (jū) nana; 8; 18: /(ʑɯR) hacɕi̥-kákokɯ → (ʑɯR) haQ-kákokɯ/; 9; 19: (jū) kyū; 10; 20: /(ni-){ʑiQ;ʑɯQ}-kákokɯ/; nan	+1	CSL_+1
kasho (ヶ所; 'cardinal place')	/káɕo/	1; 11: /(ʑɯR) iQ-káɕo/; 2; 3; 5; 12; 13; 15: SJ; 4; 14: (jū) yon; 6; 16: /(ʑɯR) ɾoQ-káɕo/; 7; 17: (jū) nana; 8; 18: /(ʑɯR) hacɕi̥-káɕo → (ʑɯR) haQ-káɕo/; 9; 19: (jū) kyū; 10; 20: /(ni-){ʑiQ;ʑɯQ}-káɕo/; nan	+1	CSL_+1
kajō (ヶ条; 'cardinal list item')	/kaʑoR/	1: /iQ-káʑoR/; 2; 3; 5; 12; 13; 15: SJ; 4; 14: (jū) yon; 6; 16: /(ʑɯR) ɾoQ-káʑoR/; 7; 17: (jū) {nana;shichi}; 8; 18: /(ʑɯR) hacɕi̥-káʑoR → (ʑɯR) haQ-káʑoR/; 9; 19: (jū) kyū; 10; 20: /(ni-){ʑiQ;ʑɯQ}-káʑoR/; 11: /ʑɯR icɕi̥-káʑoR → ʑɯR iQ-káʑoR/; nan	+1	CSL_+1
kanen (ヶ年; 'cardinal year')		1: /iQ-káneN/; 2; 3; 5: SJ; 4: yon; 6: /ɾoQ-káneN/; 7: N; 8: /hacɕi̥-káneN → haQ-káneN/; 9: kyū; 10: /{ʑiQ;ʑɯQ}-káneN/	+1	CSL_+1
kasane (重ね; 'layer')	/kasane/	1; 2; 3; 7: N; 4: yo; 5; 10: SJ; 6: /ɾokɯ̥-kásane/; 8: /hacɕi̥-kásane/; 9: kyū	+1	CSL_+1
kazoku (家族; 'family')	/kázokɯ/	1: /{icɕi̥-kázokɯ → iQ-kázokɯ} ~ hi̥to-kázokɯ/; 2: N ~ SJ; 3; 5; 12; 13; 15: SJ; 4; 14: (jū) yon; 6; 16: /(ʑɯR) ɾokɯ̥-kázokɯ → (ʑɯR) ɾoQ-kázokɯ/; 7; 17: (jū) nana; 8; 18: /(ʑɯR) hacɕi̥-kázokɯ/; 9; 19: (jū) kyū; 10; 20: /(ni-){ʑiQ;ʑɯQ}-kázokɯ/; 11: /ʑɯR icɕi̥-kázokɯ → ʑɯR iQ-kázokɯ/; nan	+1	CSL_+1
gata (型; 'type')		1; 2; 3; 5; 6; 8; 10; 11; 12; 13; 15; 16; 18; 20: SJ; 4; 14: (jū) yon; 7; 17: (jū) nana; 9; 19: (jū) kyū; nan	D	CSL_D
gatsu (月; 'ordinal month of the year')		1st ~ Jan; 2nd ~ Feb; 4th ~ Apr; 6th ~ Jun; 8th ~ Aug; 10th ~ Oct; 11th ~ Nov; 12th ~ Dec: SJ; 7th ~ Jul: SJ ~ N	−1	
gatsu (月; 'ordinal month of the year')		3th ~ Mar; 5th ~ May: SJ; 9th ~ Sep: ku; nan	P	
gakki (学期; 'school term')	/ɡaQki/	1; 2; 3; 5; 6; 8; 10: SJ; 4: yon; 7: N; 9: kyū	+1	CSL_+1
gakkyū (学級; 'study class')	/ɡaQkjɯR/	1; 2; 3; 5; 6; 8; 10: SJ; 4: yon; 7: N; 9: kyū	+1	CSL_+1
kappu (カップ; 'cup')	/káQpɯ/	1: /icɕi̥-káQpɯ ~ hi̥to-káQpɯ/; 2: SJ ~ N; 3; 5; 12; 15: SJ; 4; 14: (jū) yon; 6; 16: /(ʑɯR) ɾokɯ̥-káQpɯ/; 7; 17: (jū) nana; 8; 18: /(ʑɯR) hacɕi̥-káQpɯ/; 9; 19: (jū) kyū; 10; 20: /(ni-){ʑiQ;ʑɯQ}-káQpɯ/; 11: /ʑɯR icɕi̥-káQpɯ/; nan	+1	CSL_+1
kabu (株; 'plant with its root ~ strain of microbe ~ share of stock')	/kabɯ/	1; 2; 4; nan: N; 3; 5: SJ ~ N; 6; 16: /(ʑɯR) ɾóQ-kabɯ/; 7; 17: (jū) nana; 8; 18: /(ʑɯR) hacɕí̥-kabɯ/; 9; 19: (jū) kyū; 10; 20: /(ni-){ʑíQ;ʑɯ́Q}-kabɯ/; 11: /ʑɯR icɕí̥-kabɯ/; 12; 13: SJ; 14: jū yon	P	CS_P
kabu (株; 'plant with its root ~ strain of microbe ~ share of stock')	/kabɯ/	15: /ʑɯ́R ɡo-kabɯ ~ ʑɯ́R | ɡó-kabɯ/	XP	CS_P
karatto (カラット; 'carat')	/kaɾáQto ~ káɾaQto/	1; 11: /(ʑɯR) icɕi̥-{káɾaQto;kaɾáQto}/; 2; 3; 5; 12; 13; 15: SJ; 4; 14: (jū) yon; 6; 16: /(ʑɯR) ɾokɯ̥-{káɾaQto;kaɾáQto}/; 7; 17: (jū) nana; 8; 18: /(ʑɯR) hacɕi̥-{káɾaQto;kaɾáQto}/; 9; 19: (jū) kyū; 10; 20: /(ni-){ʑiQ;ʑɯQ}-{káɾaQto;kaɾáQto}/; nan	+1 ~ −3	CSL_+1* ~ CL_M*
karorī (カロリー; 'calorie')	/káɾoɾiR/	1; 11: /(ʑɯR) icɕi̥-káɾoɾiR/; 2; 3; 5; 12; 13; 15: SJ; 4; 14: (jū) yon; 6; 16: /(ʑɯR) ɾokɯ̥-káɾoɾiR → (ʑɯR) ɾoQ-káɾoɾiR/; 7; 17: (jū) nana; 8; 18: /(ʑɯR) hacɕi̥-káɾoɾiR/; 9; 19: (jū) kyū; 10; 20: /(ni-){ʑiQ;ʑɯQ}-káɾoɾiR/; nan	+1	CSL_+1
kan (缶; 'can')	/káN/	1: /hi̥tó-kaN ~ íQ-kaN/; 2: N ~ SJ; 3; 5; 12; 13: SJ; 4; 14: (jū) yon; 6; 16: /(ʑɯR) ɾóQ-kaN/; 7; 17: (jū) nana; 8; 18: /(ʑɯR) hacɕí̥-kaN/; 9; 19: (jū) kyū; 10; 20: /(ni-){ʑíQ;ʑɯ́Q}-kaN/; 11: /ʑɯR íQ-kaN/; nan	P	CS_P
kan (缶; 'can')	/káN/	15: /ʑɯ́R ɡo-kaN ~ ʑɯ́R | ɡó-kaN/	XP	CS_P
kan (巻; 'book volume')	/káN/	1; 11: /(ʑɯR) {íQ-kaN;iQ-káN}/; 2; 3; 5; 12; 13: SJ; 4; 14: (jū) yon; 6; 16: /(ʑɯR) {ɾóQ-kaN;ɾoQ-káN}/; 7; 17: (jū) {nana;shichi}; 8; 18: /{(ʑɯR) hacɕí̥-kaN → (ʑɯR) háQ-kaN} ~ {(ʑɯR) hacɕi̥-káN → (ʑɯR) haQ-káN}/; 9; 19: (jū) kyū; 10; 20: /(ni-){{ʑíQ;ʑɯ́Q}-kaN;{ʑiQ;ʑɯQ}-káN}/; nan	P ~ +1	CS_P* ~ CSL_+1* ~ CS_P_+1S!+1* ~ CS_P_+1S!+1!0* ~ CS_P_+1SJ*
kan (巻; 'book volume')	/káN/	15: /ʑɯ́R ɡo-kaN ~ ʑɯ́R | {ɡó-kaN;ɡo-káN}/	XP ~ X+1	CS_P* ~ CSL_+1* ~ CS_P_+1S!+1* ~ CS_P_+1S!+1!0* ~ CS_P_+1SJ*
kan (巻; 'book volume')	/káN/	iku: /íkɯ̥-kaN/	PP	CS_P* ~ CSL_+1* ~ CS_P_+1S!+1* ~ CS_P_+1S!+1!0* ~ CS_P_+1SJ*
kan (貫)	/káN/	1; 11: /(ʑɯR) {iQ-káN;íQ-kaN}/; 2; 5; 12: SJ; 3; 13: /{(ʑɯR) saN-káN → (ʑɯR) saN-ɡáN} ~ {(ʑɯR) sáN-kaN → (ʑɯR) sáN-ɡaN}/; 6; 16: /(ʑɯR) {ɾoQ-káN;ɾóQ-kaN}/; 8; 18: /{(ʑɯR) hacɕi̥-káN → (ʑɯR) haQ-káN} ~ {(ʑɯR) hacɕí̥-kaN → (ʑɯR) háQ-kaN}/; 10; 20: /(ni-){{ʑiQ;ʑɯQ}-káN;{ʑíQ;ʑɯ́Q}-kaN}/; 100: /hjaQ-káN ~ hjáQ-kaN/; nan: /{naN-káN → naN-ɡáN} ~ {náN-kaN → náN-ɡaN}/	+1 ~ P	CS_P* ~ CS_P_+1S!+1* ~ CS_P_+1S!+1!0*
kan (貫)	/káN/	4; 14: (jū) yon; 7; 17: (jū) nana; 9; 19: (jū) kyū	P	CS_P* ~ CS_P_+1S!+1* ~ CS_P_+1S!+1!0*
kan (貫)	/káN/	15: /ʑɯ́R ɡokaN ~ ʑɯ́R | {ɡo-káN;ɡó-kaN}/	X+1 ~ XP	CS_P* ~ CS_P_+1S!+1* ~ CS_P_+1S!+1!0*
kanme (貫目)	/kaN-me/	1; 11: /(ʑɯR) iQ-kaN-mé/; 2; 5; 12; 15: SJ; 3; 13: /(ʑɯR) saN-kaN-mé → (ʑɯR) saN-ɡaN-mé/; 4; 14: (jū) yon; 6; 16: /(ʑɯR) ɾoQ-kaN-mé/; 7; 17: (jū) nana; 8; 18: /(ʑɯR) hacɕi̥-kaN-mé → (ʑɯR) haQ-kaN-mé/; 9; 19: (jū) kyū; 10; 20: /(ni-){ʑiQ;ʑɯQ}-kaN-mé/; nan: /naN-kaN-mé → naN-ɡaN-mé/	−1	CSL_−1
ki (機; 'airplane') ki (期; 'phase ~ stage ~ term of incumbency ~ geological age') ki (基; 'solid standing object')	/kí/	1; 11: /(ʑɯR) íQ-ki/; 2; 3; 5; 12; 13; han: SJ; 4; 14: (jū) yon; 6; 16: /(ʑɯR) ɾóQ-ki/; 7; 17: (jū) nana; 8; 18: /(ʑɯR) hacɕí̥-ki → (ʑɯR) háQ-ki/; 9; 19: (jū) kyū; 10; 20; 30; 40; 50; 60; 70; 80; 90: /({ni;saN;joN;ɡo;ɾokɯ;nana;hacɕi;kjɯR}-){ʑíQ;ʑɯ́Q}-ki/; 100: /hjáQ-ki/; 1,000: sen; nan	P	CS_P
ki (機; 'airplane') ki (期; 'phase ~ stage ~ term of incumbency ~ geological age') ki (基; 'solid standing object')	/kí/	15: /ʑɯ́R ɡo-ki ~ ʑɯ́R | ɡó-ki/	XP	CS_P
ki (機; 'airplane') ki (期; 'phase ~ stage ~ term of incumbency ~ geological age') ki (基; 'solid standing object')	/kí/	10,000: SJ	D	CS_P
kishu (機種; 'airplane/machine model')	/kí̥ɕɯ → ki̥ɕɯ́/	1; 11: /(ʑɯR) icɕi̥-kíɕɯ/; 2; 3; 5; 12; 13; 15: SJ; 4; 14: (jū) yon; 6; 16: /(ʑɯR) ɾoQ-kí̥ɕɯ/; 7; 17: (jū) nana; 8; 18: /(ʑɯR) hacɕi̥-kíɕɯ/; 9; 19: (jū) kyū; 10; 20: /(ni-){ʑiQ;ʑɯQ}-kí̥ɕɯ/; nan	+1	CSL_+1
ki (騎; 'horse rider')		1; 11: /(ʑɯR) íQ-ki/; 2; 3; 5; 12; 13: SJ; 4; 14: (jū) yon; 6; 16: /(ʑɯR) ɾóQ-ki/; 7; 17: (jū) {nana;shichi}; 8; 18: /(ʑɯR) hacɕí̥-ki → (ʑɯR) háQ-ki/; 9; 19: (jū) kyū; 10; 20; 30; 40; 50; 60; 70; 80; 90: /({ni;saN;joN;ɡo;ɾokɯ;nana;hacɕi;kjɯR}-){ʑíQ;ʑɯ́Q}-ki/; 100: /hjáQ-ki/; 1,000: sen; nan	P	CS_P
ki (騎; 'horse rider')		15: /ʑɯ́R ɡo-ki ~ ʑɯ́R | ɡó-ki/	XP	CS_P
ki (騎; 'horse rider')		10,000: SJ	D	CS_P
kiatsu (気圧; 'atmosphere')	/kiatsɯ/	1; 11: /(ʑɯR) icɕi̥-kíatsɯ/; 2; 3; 5; 12; 13; 15: SJ; 4; 14: (jū) yon; 6; 16: /(ʑɯR) ɾoQ-kíatsɯ/; 7; 17: (jū) nana; 8; 18: /(ʑɯR) hacɕi̥-kíatsɯ/; 9; 19: (jū) kyū; 10; 20: /(ni-){ʑiQ;ʑɯQ}-kíatsɯ/; nan	+1	CSL_+1
giga (ギガ; 'gig')	/ɡíɡa/	1; 2; 3; 5; 6; 8; 10; 11; 12; 13; 15; 16; 18; 20; 30; 50; 60; 80; 90; 100; 1,000; 10,000: SJ; 4; 14: (jū) yon; 7; 17: (jū) nana; 9; 19: (jū) kyū; 40; 70: NSJ; nan	+1	CSL_+1
kyaku (脚; 'piece of legged furniture')	/kjákɯ/	1; 11: /(ʑɯR) iQ-kjakɯ́/; 6; 16: /(ʑɯR) ɾoQ-kjakɯ́/; 10: /{ʑiQ;ʑɯQ}-kjakɯ́/	−1	CS_P_−1SJQK*
kyaku (脚; 'piece of legged furniture')	/kjákɯ/	2; 3; 5; 12; 13: SJ; 4; 14: (jū) yon; 7; 17: (jū) nana; 9; 19: (jū) kyū; 20: /ni-{ʑíQ;ʑɯ́Q}-kjakɯ/; nan	P	CS_P_−1SJQK*
kyaku (脚; 'piece of legged furniture')	/kjákɯ/	8; 18: /{(ʑɯR) hacɕi̥-kjakɯ́ → (ʑɯR) haQ-kjakɯ́} ~ (ʑɯR) hacɕí̥-kjakɯ/	−1 ~ P	CS_P_−1SJQK*
kyaku (脚; 'piece of legged furniture')	/kjákɯ/	15: /ʑɯ́R ɡo-kjakɯ ~ ʑɯ́R | ɡó-kjakɯ/	XP	CS_P_−1SJQK*
kyaku (客; 'utensil for guests')	/kjakɯ/	1; 11: /(ʑɯR) iQ-kjakɯ́/; 6; 16: /(ʑɯR) ɾoQ-kjakɯ́/; 10: /{ʑiQ;ʑɯQ}-kjakɯ́/	−1	CS_P_−1SJQK*
kyaku (客; 'utensil for guests')	/kjakɯ/	2; 3; 5; 12; 13: SJ; 4; 14: (jū) yon; 7; 17: (jū) nana; 9; 19: (jū) kyū; 20: /ni-{ʑíQ;ʑɯ́Q}-kjakɯ/; nan	P	CS_P_−1SJQK*
kyaku (客; 'utensil for guests')	/kjakɯ/	8; 18: /(ʑɯR) {hacɕi̥-kjakɯ́;hacɕí̥-kjakɯ}/	−1 ~ P	CS_P_−1SJQK*
kyaku (客; 'utensil for guests')	/kjakɯ/	15: /ʑɯ́R ɡo-kjakɯ ~ ʑɯ́R | ɡó-kjakɯ/	XP	CS_P_−1SJQK*
kyū (級; 'stair ~ ranking class ~ study class')	/kjɯ́R/	1; 11: /(ʑɯR) iQ-kjɯR/; 2; 3; 5; 12; 13; 15: SJ; 4; 14: (jū) yon; 6; 16: /(ʑɯR) ɾoQ-kjɯR/; 7; 17: (jū) {nana;shichi}; 8; 18: /(ʑɯR) hacɕi̥-kjɯR → (ʑɯR) haQ-kjɯR/; 9; 19: (jū) kyū; 10; 20: /(ni-){ʑiQ;ʑɯQ}-kjɯR/	D	CSL_D
kyū (級; 'stair ~ ranking class ~ study class')	/kjɯ́R/	nan	D ~ P	CSL_D
kyū (級; 'stair ~ ranking class ~ study class')	/kjɯ́R/	iku: /{ikɯ̥;íkɯ̥}-kjɯR/	D ~ PP	CSL_D
kyū (球; 'ball pitch')	/kjɯ́R/	1; 11: /(ʑɯR) iQ-kjɯR/; 2; 3; 5; 12; 13; 15; 10,000: SJ; 4; 14: (jū) yon; 6; 16: /(ʑɯR) ɾoQ-kjɯR/; 7; 17: (jū) nana; 8; 18: /(ʑɯR) hacɕi̥-kjɯR/; 9; 19: (jū) kyū; 10: /{ʑiQ;ʑɯQ}-kjɯR/; 100: /hjaQ-kjɯR/; nan	D	CSL_D* ~ CS_D_PnJ*
kyū (球; 'ball pitch')	/kjɯ́R/	20; 30; 40; 50; 60; 70; 80; 90: /{ni;saN;joN;ɡo;ɾokɯ;nana;hacɕi;kjɯR}-{ʑíQ;ʑɯ́Q;ʑiQ;ʑɯQ}-kjɯR/; 1,000: SJ	P ~ D	CSL_D* ~ CS_D_PnJ*
kyūme (球目; 'ordinal ball pitch')		1st; 11th: /(ʑɯR) iQ-kjɯR-mé/; 2nd; 3rd; 5th; 12th; 13th; 15th: SJ; 4th; 14th: (jū) yon; 6th; 16th: /(ʑɯR) ɾoQ-kjɯR-mé/; 7th; 17th: (jū) nana; 8th; 18th: /(ʑɯR) hacɕi̥-kjɯR-mé/; 9th; 19th: (jū) kyū; 10th; 20th: /(ni-){ʑiQ;ʑɯQ}-kjɯR-mé/; nan	−1	CSL_−1
gyō (行; 'line of text')	/ɡjóR/	1; 2; 3; 5; 6; 8; 10; 11; 12; 13; 16; 18; 20: SJ; 4; 14: (jū) yon; 7; 17: (jū) {nana;shichi}; 9; 19: (jū) kyū; nan	P	CS_P
gyō (行; 'line of text')	/ɡjóR/	15: /ʑɯ́R ɡo-ɡjoR ~ ʑɯ́R | ɡó-ɡjoR/	XP	CS_P
kyoku (曲; 'musical composition')	/kjokɯ ~ kjókɯ/	1; 11: /(ʑɯR) iQ-kjokɯ́/; 10: /{ʑiQ;ʑɯQ}-kjokɯ́/	−1	CS_P_−1SJQK*
kyoku (曲; 'musical composition')	/kjokɯ ~ kjókɯ/	2; 3; 5; 12; 13: SJ; 4; 14: (jū) yon; 7; 17: (jū) nana; 9; 19: (jū) kyū; 20: /ni-{ʑíQ;ʑɯ́Q}-kjokɯ/; nan	P	CS_P_−1SJQK*
kyoku (曲; 'musical composition')	/kjokɯ ~ kjókɯ/	6; 16: /(ʑɯR) {ɾoQ-kjokɯ́;ɾóQ-kjokɯ}/; 8; 18: /{(ʑɯR) hacɕi̥-kjokɯ́ → (ʑɯR) haQ-kjokɯ́} ~ {(ʑɯR) hacɕí̥-kjokɯ → (ʑɯR) háQ-kjokɯ}/	−1 ~ P	CS_P_−1SJQK*
kyoku (曲; 'musical composition')	/kjokɯ ~ kjókɯ/	15: /ʑɯ́R ɡo-kjokɯ ~ ʑɯ́R | ɡó-kjokɯ/	XP	CS_P_−1SJQK*
kyoku (局; 'board game match')	/kjókɯ/	1; 11: /(ʑɯR) iQ-kjokɯ́/; 10: /{ʑiQ;ʑɯQ}-kjokɯ́/	−1	CS_P_−1SJQK*
kyoku (局; 'board game match')	/kjókɯ/	2; 3; 5; 12; 13: SJ; 4; 14: (jū) yon; 7; 17: (jū) nana; 9; 19: (jū) kyū; 20: /ni-{ʑíQ;ʑɯ́Q}-kjokɯ/; nan	P	CS_P_−1SJQK*
kyoku (局; 'board game match')	/kjókɯ/	6; 16: /(ʑɯR) {ɾoQ-kjokɯ́;ɾóQ-kjokɯ}/; 8; 18: /{(ʑɯR) hacɕi̥-kjokɯ́ → (ʑɯR) haQ-kjokɯ́} ~ {(ʑɯR) hacɕí̥-kjokɯ → (ʑɯR) háQ-kjokɯ}/	−1 ~ P	CS_P_−1SJQK*
kyoku (局; 'board game match')	/kjókɯ/	15: /ʑɯ́R ɡo-kjokɯ ~ ʑɯ́R | ɡó-kjokɯ/	XP	CS_P_−1SJQK*
kire (切れ; 'slice')	/kiɾé/	1; 2; 4; nan: N; 3: N ~ SJ; 5: /{ɡó;itsɯ̥́}-kiɾe/; 6: /{ɾóQ;mɯ́}-kiɾe/; 7; 17: (jū) nana; 8: /{hacɕí̥;já}-kiɾe/; 9; 19: (jū) kyū; 10: /{ʑíQ;ʑɯ́Q;tó}-kiɾe/; 11: /ʑɯR icɕí̥-kiɾe/; 12; 13: SJ; 14: jū yon; 16: /ʑɯR ɾóQ-kiɾe/; 18: /ʑɯR hacɕí̥-kiɾe/; 20: /ni-{ʑíQ;ʑɯ́Q}-kiɾe/	P	CS_P
kire (切れ; 'slice')	/kiɾé/	15: /ʑɯ́R ɡo-kiɾe ~ ʑɯ́R | ɡó-kiɾe/	XP	CS_P
kire (切れ; 'slice')	/kiɾé/	han	D ~ −1	CS_P
kiro (キロ; 'kilo')	/kíɾo/	1; 11: /(ʑɯR) icɕí̥-kiɾo/; 2; 3; 5; 12; 13: SJ; 4; 14: (jū) yon; 6; 16: /(ʑɯR) ɾóQ-kiɾo/; 7; 17: (jū) nana; 8; 18: /(ʑɯR) hacɕí̥-kiɾo/; 9; 19: (jū) kyū; 10; 20; 30; 40; 50; 60; 70; 80; 90: /({ni;saN;joN;ɡo;ɾokɯ;nana;hacɕi;kjɯR}-){ʑíQ;ʑɯ́Q}-kiɾo/; 100: /hjáQ-kiɾo/; 1,000: sen; nan	P	CS_P
kiro (キロ; 'kilo')	/kíɾo/	15: /ʑɯ́R ɡo-kiɾo ~ ʑɯ́R | ɡó-kiɾo/	XP	CS_P
kiro (キロ; 'kilo')	/kíɾo/	10,000: SJ	D	CS_P
kiroguramu (キログラム; 'kilogram')	/kiɾoɡɯ́ɾamɯ/	1; 11: /(ʑɯR) icɕi̥-kiɾoɡɯ́ɾamɯ/; 2; 3; 5; 12; 13; 15: SJ; 4; 14: (jū) yon; 6; 16: /(ʑɯR) ɾoQ-kiɾoɡɯ́ɾamɯ/; 7; 17: (jū) {nana;shichi}; 8; 18: /(ʑɯR) hacɕi̥-kiɾoɡɯ́ɾamɯ → (ʑɯR) haQ-kiɾoɡɯ́ɾamɯ/; 9; 19: (jū) kyū; 10; 20: /(ni-){ʑiQ;ʑɯQ}-kiɾoɡɯ́ɾamɯ/; nan; iku: /ikɯ̥-kiɾoɡɯ́ɾamɯ/	−3	CL_M
kiromētoru (キロメートル; 'kilometre')	/kiɾoméRtoɾɯ/	1; 11: /(ʑɯR) icɕi̥-kiɾoméRtoɾɯ/; 2; 3; 5; 12; 13; 15: SJ; 4; 14: (jū) yon; 6; 16: /(ʑɯR) ɾoQ-kiɾoméRtoɾɯ/; 7; 17: (jū) nana; 8; 18: /(ʑɯR) hacɕi̥-kiɾoméRtoɾɯ/; 9; 19: (jū) kyū; 10; 20: /(ni-){ʑiQ;ʑɯQ}-kiɾoméRtoɾɯ/; nan	−4	CL_M
kirorittoru (キロリットル; 'kilolitre')	/kiɾoɾíQtoɾɯ/	1; 11: /(ʑɯR) icɕi̥-kiɾoɾíQtoɾɯ/; 2; 3; 5; 12; 13; 15: SJ; 4; 14: (jū) yon; 6; 16: /(ʑɯR) ɾoQ-kiɾoɾíQtoɾɯ/; 7; 17: (jū) nana; 8; 18: /(ʑɯR) hacɕi̥-kiɾoɾíQtoɾɯ/; 9; 19: (jū) kyū; 10; 20: /(ni-){ʑiQ;ʑɯQ}-kiɾoɾíQtoɾɯ/; nan	−4	CL_M
kirowatto (キロワット; 'kilowatt')	/kiɾowáQto/	1; 11: /(ʑɯR) icɕi̥-kiɾowáQto/; 2; 3; 5; 12; 13; 15: SJ; 4; 14: (jū) yon; 6; 16: /(ʑɯR) ɾoQ-kiɾowáQto/; 7; 17: (jū) nana; 8; 18: /(ʑɯR) hacɕi̥-kiɾowáQto/; 9; 19: (jū) kyū; 10; 20: /(ni-){ʑiQ;ʑɯQ}-kiɾowáQto/; nan	−3	CL_M
kin (斤; 'catty')	/kíN/	1; 11: /(ʑɯR) íQ-kiN/; 2; 5; 12: SJ; 3; 13: /(ʑɯR) sáN-kiN → (ʑɯR) sáN-ɡiN/; 4; 14: (jū) yon; 6; 16: /(ʑɯR) ɾóQ-kiN/; 7; 17: (jū) nana; 8; 18: /(ʑɯR) hacɕí̥-kiN/; 9; 19: (jū) kyū; 10; 20: /(ni-){ʑíQ;ʑɯ́Q}-kiN/; han: /háN-ɡiN/; nan: /náN-kiN → náN-ɡiN/	P	CS_P
kin (斤; 'catty')	/kíN/	15: /ʑɯ́R ɡo-kiN ~ ʑɯ́R | ɡó-kiN/	XP	CS_P
ku (句; 'verse')	/kɯ́/	1; 11: /(ʑɯR) íQ-kɯ/; 2; 3; 5; 12; 13; han: SJ; 4; 14: (jū) yon; 6; 16: /(ʑɯR) ɾóQ-kɯ/; 7; 17: (jū) nana; 8; 18: /(ʑɯR) hacɕí̥-kɯ → (ʑɯR) háQ-kɯ/; 9; 19: (jū) kyū; 10; 20: /(ni-){ʑíQ;ʑɯ́Q}-kɯ/; nan	P	CS_P
ku (句; 'verse')	/kɯ́/	15: /ʑɯ́R ɡo-kɯ ~ ʑɯ́R | ɡó-kɯ/	XP	CS_P
ku (区; 'zone ~ section')	/kɯ́/	1; 11: /(ʑɯR) íQ-kɯ/; 2; 3; 5; 12; 13: SJ; 4; 14: (jū) yon; 6; 16: /(ʑɯR) ɾóQ-kɯ/; 7; 17: (jū) nana; 8; 18: /(ʑɯR) hacɕí̥-kɯ/; 9; 19: (jū) kyū; 10; 20: /(ni-){ʑíQ;ʑɯ́Q}-kɯ/; nan	P	CS_P
ku (区; 'zone ~ section')	/kɯ́/	15: /ʑɯ́R ɡo-kɯ ~ ʑɯ́R | ɡó-kɯ/	XP	CS_P
kukaku (区画; 'land section')	/kɯ̥kakɯ/	1: /{icɕi-kɯ̥́kakɯ → iQ-kɯ̥́kakɯ} ~ icɕi̥-kɯ́kakɯ ~ hi̥to-kɯ̥́kakɯ/; 2: N ~ SJ; 3; 5; 12; 13; 15: SJ; 4; 14: (jū) yon; 6; 16: /(ʑɯR) ɾoQ-kɯ̥́kakɯ/; 7; 17: (jū) nana; 8; 18: /{(ʑɯR) hacɕi-kɯ̥́kakɯ → (ʑɯR) haQ-kɯ̥́kakɯ} ~ (ʑɯR) hacɕi̥-kɯ́kakɯ/; 9; 19: (jū) kyū; 10; 20: /(ni-){ʑiQ;ʑɯQ}-kɯ̥́kakɯ/; 11: /{(ʑɯR) icɕi-kɯ̥́kakɯ → (ʑɯR) iQ-kɯ̥́kakɯ} ~ (ʑɯR) icɕi̥-kɯ́kakɯ/; nan	+1	CSL_+1
kukan (区間; 'road section ~ mathematical interval')	/kɯ̥́kaN → kɯ̥káN/	1: /{icɕi-kɯ̥́kaN → iQ-kɯ̥́kaN} ~ icɕi̥-kɯ́kaN ~ hi̥to-kɯ̥́kaN/; 2: N ~ SJ; 3; 5; 12; 13; 15: SJ; 4; 14: (jū) yon; 6; 16: /(ʑɯR) ɾoQ-kɯ̥́kaN/; 7; 17: (jū) nana; 8; 18: /{(ʑɯR) hacɕi-kɯ̥́kaN → (ʑɯR) haQ-kɯ̥́kaN} ~ hacɕi̥-kɯ́kaN/; 9; 19: (jū) kyū; 10; 20: /(ni-){ʑiQ;ʑɯQ}-kɯ̥́kaN/; 11: /{(ʑɯR) icɕi-kɯ̥́kaN → (ʑɯR) iQ-kɯ̥́kaN} ~ (ʑɯR) icɕi̥-kɯ́kaN/; nan	+1	CSL_+1
kuchi (口; 'mouthful ~ sharp weapon ~ monetary contribution ~ dance performance')	/kɯ̥cɕi/	1; 2; 4; nan: N; 3: N ~ SJ; 5; 12; 13: SJ; 7; 17: (jū) nana; 9; 19: (jū) kyū; 11: /ʑɯR icɕí-kɯ̥cɕi → ʑɯR íQ-kɯ̥cɕi/; 14: jū yon	P	CS_P*
kuchi (口; 'mouthful ~ sharp weapon ~ monetary contribution ~ dance performance')	/kɯ̥cɕi/	6; 16: /(ʑɯR) {ɾoQ-kɯ̥cɕí;ɾóQ-kɯ̥cɕi}/; 8; 18: /(ʑɯR) {haQ-kɯ̥cɕí;háQ-kɯ̥cɕi}/; 10; 20: /(ni-){{ʑíQ;ʑɯ́Q}-kɯ̥cɕi;{ʑiQ;ʑɯQ}-kɯ̥cɕí}/	−1 ~ P	CS_P*
kuchi (口; 'mouthful ~ sharp weapon ~ monetary contribution ~ dance performance')	/kɯ̥cɕi/	15: /ʑɯ́R ɡo-kɯ̥cɕi ~ ʑɯ́R | ɡó-kɯ̥cɕi/	XP	CS_P*
kuchi (口; 'mouthful ~ sharp weapon ~ monetary contribution ~ dance performance')	/kɯ̥cɕi/	han	D	CS_P*
kumi (組; 'set ~ group')	/kɯmí/	1; 4; nan: N; 3: SJ ~ N; 5: /{ɡó;itsɯ̥́}-kɯmi/; 6; 16: /(ʑɯR) ɾóQ-kɯmi/; 7; 17: (jū) nana; 8; 18: /(ʑɯR) hacɕí̥-kɯmi → háQ-kɯmi/; 9; 19: (jū) kyū; 10: /{ʑíQ;ʑɯ́Q;tó}-kɯmi/; 11: /ʑɯR icɕí̥-kɯmi/; 12; 13; han: SJ; 14: jū yon; 20: /ni-{ʑíQ;ʑɯ́Q}-kɯmi/; 100: /hjáQ-kɯmi/	P	CS_P*
kumi (組; 'set ~ group')	/kɯmí/	2: N	P ~ −1 ~ D	CS_P*
kumi (組; 'set ~ group')	/kɯmí/	15: /ʑɯ́R ɡo-kɯmi ~ ʑɯ́R | ɡó-kɯmi/	XP	CS_P*
kumi (組; 'school class')	/kɯmí/	1: /icɕí̥-kɯmi → icɕi̥-kɯ́mi/	P → +1 (Note: The nucleus shifts rightward away from the devoiced vowel.)	CS_P*
kumi (組; 'school class')	/kɯmí/	2; 3; 5; 12; 13: SJ; 4; 14: (jū) yon; 6; 16: /(ʑɯR) ɾóQ-kɯmi/; 7; 17: (jū) nana; 8; 18: /(ʑɯR) hacɕí̥-kɯmi/; 9; 19: (jū) kyū; 10; 20: /(ni-){ʑíQ;ʑɯ́Q}-kɯmi/; 11: /ʑɯR icɕí̥-kɯmi/; nan	P	CS_P*
kumi (組; 'school class')	/kɯmí/	15: /ʑɯ́R ɡo-kɯmi ~ ʑɯ́R | ɡó-kɯmi/	XP	CS_P*
kurasu (クラス; 'class')	/kɯ́ɾasɯ/	1; 2: N	+1 ~ P	CSL_+1*
kurasu (クラス; 'class')	/kɯ́ɾasɯ/	1; 11: /(ʑɯR) icɕi̥-kɯ́ɾasɯ/; 2; 3; 5; 12; 13; 15: SJ; 4; 14: (jū) yon; 6; 16: /(ʑɯR) ɾoQ-kɯ́ɾasɯ/; 7; 17: (jū) nana; 8; 18: /(ʑɯR) hacɕi̥-kɯ́ɾasɯ → (ʑɯR) haQ-kɯ́ɾasɯ/; 9; 19: (jū) kyū; 10; 20: /(ni-){ʑiQ;ʑɯQ}-kɯ́ɾasɯ/; nan	+1	CSL_+1*
guramu (グラム; 'gram')	/ɡɯ́ɾamɯ/	1; 2; 3; 5; 6; 8; 10; 11; 12; 13; 15; 16; 18; 20: SJ; 4; 14: (jū) yon; 7; 17: (jū) nana; 9; 19: (jū) kyū; nan	+1	CSL_+1
gurūpu (グループ; 'group')	/ɡɯɾɯ́Rpɯ/	1; 2: SJ ~ N; 3; 5; 6; 8; 10; 11; 12; 13; 15; 16; 18; 20: SJ; 4; 14: (jū) yon; 7; 17: (jū) nana; 9; 19: (jū) kyū; nan	−3	CL_M
keitō (系統; 'system')	/keitoR/	1; 11: /(ʑɯR) icɕi̥-kéitoR → (ʑɯR) iQ-kéitoR/; 2; 3; 5; 12; 13; 15: SJ; 4; 14: (jū) yon; 6; 16: /(ʑɯR) ɾokɯ̥-kéitoR → (ʑɯR) ɾoQ-kéitoR/; 7; 17: (jū) nana; 8; 18: /(ʑɯR) hacɕi̥-kéitoR/; 9; 19: (jū) kyū; 10; 20: /(ni-){ʑiQ;ʑɯQ}-kéitoR/; nan	+1	CSL_+1
keta (桁; 'numerical place')	/keta/	1; 2; 4; nan: N; 3: SJ ~ N; 5: /{ɡó;itsɯ̥́}-keta/; 6; 16: /(ʑɯR) ɾóQ-keta/; 7; 17: (jū) nana; 8; 18: /(ʑɯR) hacɕí̥-keta → (ʑɯR) háQ-keta/; 9; 19: (jū) kyū; 10; 20: /(ni-){ʑíQ;ʑɯ́Q}-keta/; 11: /(ʑɯR) icɕí̥-keta → (ʑɯR) íQ-keta/; 12; 13: SJ; 14: jū yon	P	CS_P
keta (桁; 'numerical place')	/keta/	15: /ʑɯ́R ɡo-keta ~ ʑɯ́R | ɡó-keta/	XP	CS_P
ken (件; 'incident')	/kéN/	1; 11: /(ʑɯR) íQ-keN/; 2; 3; 5; 12; 13: SJ; 4; 14: (jū) yon; 6; 16: /(ʑɯR) ɾóQ-keN/; 7; 17: (jū) nana; 8; 18: /(ʑɯR) hacɕí̥-keN → (ʑɯR) háQ-keN/; 9; 19: (jū) kyū; 10; 50; 60; 70; 80: /({ɡo;ɾokɯ;nana;hacɕi}-){ʑíQ;ʑɯ́Q}-keN/; 100: /hjáQ-keN/; 1,000: sen; nan	P	CS_P
ken (件; 'incident')	/kéN/	15: /ʑɯ́R ɡo-keN ~ ʑɯ́R | ɡó-keN/	XP	CS_P
ken (件; 'incident')	/kéN/	20; 30; 40; 90: /{{ni;saN;joN;kjɯR}-{ʑíQ;ʑɯ́Q};{ní;sáN;jóN;kjɯ́R}-{ʑiQ;ʑɯQ}}-keN/	P ~ R	CS_P
ken (件; 'incident')	/kéN/	10,000: SJ	D	CS_P
ken (軒; 'house')	/kéN/	1; 11: /(ʑɯR) íQ-keN/; 2; 5; 12: SJ; 3; 13: /(ʑɯR) sáN-ɡeN/; 4; 14: (jū) yon; 6; 16: /(ʑɯR) ɾóQ-keN/; 7; 17: (jū) nana; 8; 18: /(ʑɯR) hacɕí̥-keN → (ʑɯR) háQ-keN/; 9; 19: (jū) kyū; 10; 50; 60; 70; 80: /({ɡo;ɾokɯ;nana;hacɕi}-){ʑíQ;ʑɯ́Q}-keN/; 100: /hjáQ-keN/; 1,000: /séN-ɡeN/; nan	P	CS_P
ken (軒; 'house')	/kéN/	15: /ʑɯ́R ɡo-keN ~ ʑɯ́R | ɡó-keN/	XP	CS_P
ken (軒; 'house')	/kéN/	20; 30; 40; 90: /{{ni;saN;joN;kjɯR}-{ʑíQ;ʑɯ́Q};{ní;sáN;jóN;kjɯ́R}-{ʑiQ;ʑɯQ}}-keN/	P ~ R	CS_P
ken (軒; 'house')	/kéN/	10,000: /icɕi-maN-ɡeN/	D	CS_P
gen (元; 'yuan')	/ɡéN/	1; 2; 3; 5; 6; 8; 10; 11; 12; 13; 16; 18; 20: SJ; 4; 14: (jū) yon; 7; 17: (jū) nana; 9; 19: (jū) kyū; nan	P	CS_P
gen (元; 'yuan')	/ɡéN/	15: /ʑɯ́R ɡo-ɡeN ~ ʑɯ́R | ɡó-ɡeN/	XP	CS_P
ko (戸; 'house(hold)')	/kó/	1; 11: /(ʑɯR) íQ-ko/; 2; 3; 5; 12; 13: SJ; 4; 14: (jū) yon; 6; 16: /(ʑɯR) ɾóQ-ko/; 7; 17: (jū) nana; 8; 18: /(ʑɯR) hacɕí̥-ko/; 9; 19: (jū) kyū; 10; 20; 30; 40; 50; 60; 70; 80; 90: /({ni;saN;joN;ɡo;ɾokɯ;nana;hacɕi;kjɯR}-){ʑíQ;ʑɯ́Q}-ko/; 100: /hjáQ-ko/; 1,000: sen; nan	P	CS_P
ko (戸; 'house(hold)')	/kó/	15: /ʑɯ́R ɡo-ko ~ ʑɯ́R | ɡó-ko/	XP	CS_P
ko (戸; 'house(hold)')	/kó/	10,000: SJ	D	CS_P
ko (個; 'thing')	/kó/	1; 11: /(ʑɯR) íQ-ko/; 2; 3; 5; 12; 13: SJ; 4; 14: (jū) yon; 6; 16: /(ʑɯR) ɾóQ-ko/; 7; 17: (jū) {nana;shichi}; 8; 18: /(ʑɯR) hacɕí̥-ko → (ʑɯR) háQ-ko/; 9; 19: (jū) kyū; 10; 20; 30; 40; 50; 60; 70; 80; 90: /({ni;saN;joN;ɡo;ɾokɯ;nana;hacɕi;kjɯR}-){ʑíQ;ʑɯ́Q}-ko/; 100: /hjáQ-ko/; 1,000: sen; nan	P	CS_P
ko (個; 'thing')	/kó/	15: /ʑɯ́R ɡo-ko ~ ʑɯ́R | ɡó-ko/	XP	CS_P
ko (個; 'thing')	/kó/	10,000: SJ	D	CS_P
ko (個; 'thing')	/kó/	iku: /íkɯ̥-ko/	PP	CS_P
go (語; 'word')	/ɡó/	1; 2; 3; 5; 6; 8; 10; 11; 12; 13; 16; 18; 20: SJ; 4; 14: (jū) yon; 7; 17: (jū) nana; 9; 19: (jū) kyū; nan	P	CS_P
go (語; 'word')	/ɡó/	15: /ʑɯ́R ɡo-ɡo ~ ʑɯ́R | ɡó-ɡo/	XP	CS_P
kō (校; 'school')	/kóR/	1; 11: /(ʑɯR) íQ-koR/; 2; 3; 5; 12; 13: SJ; 4; 14: (jū) yon; 6; 16: /(ʑɯR) ɾóQ-koR/; 7; 17: (jū) nana; 8; 18: /(ʑɯR) hacɕí̥-koR → (ʑɯR) háQ-koR/; 9; 19: (jū) kyū; 10; 20; 30; 40; 50; 60; 70; 80; 90: /({ni;saN;joN;ɡo;ɾokɯ;nana;hacɕi;kjɯR}-){ʑíQ;ʑɯ́Q}-koR/; 100: /hjáQ-koR/; 1,000: sen; nan	P	CS_P
kō (校; 'school')	/kóR/	15: /ʑɯ́R ɡo-koR ~ ʑɯ́R | ɡó-koR/	XP	CS_P
kō (校; 'school')	/kóR/	10,000; SJ	D	CS_P
kō (校; 'ordinal proofed copy')	/kóR/	1st; 11th: /(ʑɯR) iQ-koR/ (Note: More commonly; shokō (初校; /ɕo-koR/ 'the first proof').); 2nd; (Note: More commonly; saikō (再校; /sai-koR/ 'the second proof').) 3rd; 5th; 12th; 13th; 15th; 1,000; 10,000: SJ; 4th; 14th: (jū) yon; 6th; 16th: /(ʑɯR) ɾoQ-koR/; 7th; 17th: (jū) nana; 8th; 18th: /(ʑɯR) hacɕi̥-koR/; 9th; 19th: (jū) kyū; 10th; 20th; 30th; 40th; 50th; 60th; 70th; 80th; 90th: /({ni;saN;joN;ɡo;ɾokɯ;nana;hacɕi;kjɯR}-){ʑiQ;ʑɯQ}-koR/; 100th: /hjaQ-koR/; nan	D	CSL_D
gō (号; 'periodical issue')	/ɡóR/	1; 2; 3; 5; 6; 8; 10; 11; 12; 13; 16; 18; 50; 60; 80; 200; 500; 600; 800: SJ; 4; 14: (jū) yon; 7; 17: (jū) {nana;shichi}; 9; 19: (jū) kyū; 70; 700: NSJ; nan	P	CS_P
gō (号; 'periodical issue')	/ɡóR/	15: /ʑɯ́R ɡo-ɡoR ~ ʑɯ́R | ɡo-ɡoR/	XP	CS_P
gō (号; 'periodical issue')	/ɡóR/	20; 30; 90; 300; 900: SJ; 40; 400: NSJ	P ~ R	CS_P
gō (合; 'gě ~ confrontation')	/ɡóR/	1; 2; 4; 6; 8; 11; 12; 16; 18: SJ; 5: /ɡo(N)-ɡóR ~ ɡó-ɡoR/	+1 ~ P	CS_P*
gō (合; 'gě ~ confrontation')	/ɡóR/	3; 10; 13: SJ; 4; 14: (jū) yon; 7; 17: (jū) nana; 9; 19: (jū) kyū; nan	P	CS_P*
gō (合; 'gě ~ confrontation')	/ɡóR/	15: /ʑɯ́R ɡo-ɡoR ~ ʑɯ́R | {ɡo-ɡóR;ɡó-ɡoR}/	X+1 ~ XP	CS_P*
gō (合; 'gě ~ confrontation')	/ɡóR/	20: SJ	P ~ R	CS_P*
kōtei (工程; 'process')	/koRtei/	1; 11: /(ʑɯR) icɕi̥-kóRtei → (ʑɯR) iQ-kóRtei/; 2; 3; 5; 12; 13; 15: SJ; 4; 14: (jū) yon; 6; 16: /(ʑɯR) ɾokɯ̥-kóRtei → (ʑɯR) ɾoQ-kóRtei/; 7; 17: (jū) nana; 8; 18: /(ʑɯR) hacɕi̥-kóRtei/; 9; 19: (jū) kyū; 10; 20: /(ni-){ʑiQ;ʑɯQ}-kóRtei/; nan	+1	CSL_+1
kōnen (光年; 'light year')	/koRneN ~ kóRneN/	1: /icɕi̥-kóRneN/; 2; 3; 5: SJ; 4: yon; 6: /ɾokɯ̥-kóRneN → ɾoQ-kóRneN/; 7: N; 8: /hacɕi̥-kóRneN/; 9: kyū; 10: /{ʑiQ;ʑɯQ}-kóRneN/	+1	CSL_+1
kōmoku (項目; 'category')	/koRmokɯ/	1: /{icɕi̥-kóRmokɯ → iQ-kóRmokɯ} ~ hi̥to-kóRmokɯ/; 2: SJ ~ N; 3; 5; 12; 13; 15: SJ; 4; 14: (jū) yon; 6; 16: /(ʑɯR) ɾokɯ̥-kóRmokɯ → (ʑɯR) ɾoQ-kóRmokɯ/; 7; 17: (jū) nana; 8; 18: /(ʑɯR) hacɕi̥-kóRmokɯ/; 9; 19: (jū) kyū; 10; 20: /(ni-){ʑiQ;ʑɯQ}-kóRmokɯ/; 11: /ʑɯR icɕi̥-kóRmokɯ → ʑɯR iQ-kóRmokɯ/; nan	+1	CSL_+1
koku (石)	/kókɯ/	1; 11: /(ʑɯR) iQ-kokɯ́/; 6; 16: /(ʑɯR) ɾoQ-kokɯ́/; 8; 18: /(ʑɯR) hacɕi̥-kokɯ́/; 10: /{ʑiQ;ʑɯQ}-kokɯ́/	−1	CS_P_−1SJQK
koku (石)	/kókɯ/	2; 5; 12: SJ; 3; 13: /(ʑɯR) sáN-kokɯ → (ʑɯR) sáN-ɡokɯ/; 4; 14: (jū) yon; 7; 17: (jū) nana; 9; 19: (jū) kyū; 20: /ni-{ʑíQ;ʑɯ́Q}-kokɯ/; nan: /náN-kokɯ → náN-ɡokɯ/	P	CS_P_−1SJQK
koku (石)	/kókɯ/	15: /ʑɯ́R ɡo-kokɯ ~ ʑɯ́R | ɡó-kokɯ/	XP	CS_P_−1SJQK
sai (歳; 'year old')		0: E ~ SJ; 1; 11: /(ʑɯR) íQ-sai/; 2; 3; 5; 12; 13: SJ; 4; 14: (jū) yon; 7; 17: (jū) {nana;shichi}; 8; 18: /(ʑɯR) háQ-sai/; 9; 19: (jū) kyū; 10; 50; 60; 80: /({ɡo;ɾokɯ;hacɕi}-){ʑíQ;ʑɯ́Q}-sai/; 70: /{nana;ɕi̥cɕi}-{ʑíQ;ʑɯ́Q}-sai/; 1,000: sen; nan	P	CS_P*
sai (歳; 'year old')		6: /ɾokɯ̥́-sai → ɾokɯ̥-sái/; 100: /hjakɯ̥́-sai → hjakɯ̥-sái/	P → +1	CS_P*
sai (歳; 'year old')		15: /ʑɯ́R ɡo-sai ~ ʑɯ́R | ɡó-sai ~ ʑɯR ɡó-sai/	XP ~ P	CS_P*
sai (歳; 'year old')		16: /ʑɯR ɾokɯ̥́-sai → ʑɯR ɾókɯ̥-sai/	P → PP (Note: The nucleus shifts leftward away from the devoiced vowel.)	CS_P*
sai (歳; 'year old')		20; 30; 40; 90: /{{ni;saN;joN;kjɯR}-{ʑíQ;ʑɯ́Q};{ní;sáN;jóN;kjɯ́R}-{ʑiQ;ʑɯQ}}-sai/	P ~ R	CS_P*
sai (歳; 'year old')		10,000: SJ	D	CS_P*
sai (歳; 'year old')		han	P ~ D	CS_P*
sai (歳; 'year old')		iku: /íkɯ̥-sai/	PP	CS_P*
saikuru (サイクル; 'cycle')	/sáikɯɾɯ/	1: /icɕi̥-sáikɯɾɯ/; 2; 3; 5: SJ; 4: yon; 6: /ɾokɯ̥-sáikɯɾɯ/; 7: N; 8: /hacɕi̥-sáikɯɾɯ/; 9: kyū; 10: /{ʑiQ;ʑɯQ}-sáikɯɾɯ/	+1	CSL_+1
satsu (冊; 'book')		1; 11: /(ʑɯR) iQ-satsɯ́/; 10: /{ʑiQ;ʑɯQ}-satsɯ́/	−1	CS_P_−1SJQK*
satsu (冊; 'book')		2; 3; 5; 12; 13: SJ; 4; 14: (jū) yon; 7; 17: (jū) {nana;shichi}; 9; 19: (jū) kyū; 50; 60; 70; 80: /{ɡo;ɾokɯ;nana;hacɕi}-{ʑíQ;ʑɯ́Q}-satsɯ/; 200; 500; 700: /{ni;ɡo;nana}-hjakɯ̥́-satsɯ/; 600; 800: /{ɾoQ;haQ}-pjakɯ̥́-satsɯ/; 1,000: sen; nan: /náN-satsɯ → náN-zatsɯ}/	P	CS_P_−1SJQK*
satsu (冊; 'book')		6; 16: /(ʑɯR) {ɾokɯ̥-satsɯ́;ɾokɯ̥́-satsɯ}/; 8; 18: /(ʑɯR) {haQ-satsɯ́;háQ-satsɯ}/; 100: /hjakɯ̥-satsɯ́ ~ hjakɯ̥́-satsɯ/	−1 ~ P	CS_P_−1SJQK*
satsu (冊; 'book')		15: /ʑɯ́R ɡo-satsɯ ~ ʑɯ́R | ɡó-satsɯ/	XP	CS_P_−1SJQK*
satsu (冊; 'book')		20; 30; 40; 90: /{{ni;saN;joN;kjɯR}-{ʑíQ;ʑɯ́Q};{ní;sáN;jóN;kjɯ́R}-{ʑiQ;ʑɯQ}}-satsɯ/; 300: /{saN-bjakɯ̥́;sáN-bjakɯ̥}-satsɯ/; 400; 900: /{{joN;kjɯR}-hjakɯ̥́;{jóN;kjɯ́R}-hjakɯ̥}-satsɯ/	P ~ R	CS_P_−1SJQK*
satsu (冊; 'book')		10,000: SJ	D	CS_P_−1SJQK*
satsu (冊; 'book')		iku: /íkɯ̥-satsɯ/	PP	CS_P_−1SJQK*
sara (皿; 'plate of food')	/saɾa/	1; 2; 4; nan: N; 3: SJ ~ N; 5: /{ɡó;itsɯ̥́}-saɾa/; 6; 16: /(ʑɯR) ɾokɯ̥́-saɾa/; 7; 17: (jū) nana; 8; 18: /(ʑɯR) hacɕí̥-saɾa/; 9; 19: (jū) kyū; 10: /{ʑíQ;ʑɯ́Q;tó}-saɾa/; 11: /ʑɯR íQ-saɾa/; 12; 13: SJ; 14: jū yon; 20: /ni-{ʑíQ;ʑɯ́Q}-saɾa/	P	CS_P
sara (皿; 'plate of food')	/saɾa/	15: /ʑɯ́R ɡo-saɾa ~ ʑɯ́R | ɡó-saɾa/	XP	CS_P
shi (市; 'city')	/ɕí/	1; 11: /(ʑɯR) íQ-ɕi/; 2; 3; 5; 12; 13: SJ; 4; 14: (jū) yon; 6; 16: /(ʑɯR) ɾokɯ̥́-ɕi/; 7; 17: (jū) nana; 8; 18: /(ʑɯR) hacɕí̥-ɕi → (ʑɯR) háQ-ɕi/; 9; 19: (jū) kyū; 10; 20: /(ni-){ʑíQ;ʑɯ́Q}-ɕi/; nan	P	CS_P
shi (市; 'city')	/ɕí/	15: /ʑɯ́R ɡo-ɕi ~ ʑɯ́R | ɡó-ɕi/	XP	CS_P
ji (児; 'child')	/ʑí/	1; 2; 3; 5; 6; 8; 10; 11; 12; 13; 16; 18; 20: SJ; 4; nan: N; 7; 17: (jū) nana; 9; 19: (jū) kyū; 14: jū yon	P	CS_P
ji (児; 'child')	/ʑí/	14; 15: /ʑɯ́R {jo;ɡo}-ʑi ~ ʑɯ́R | {jó;ɡó}-ʑi/	XP	CS_P
ji (次; 'ordinal occurrence')		1st; 2nd; 3rd; 5th; 6th; 8th; 10th; 11th; 12th; 13th; 16th; 18th; 20th: SJ; 4th; nan: N; 7th; 17th: (jū) nana; 9th; 19th: (jū) kyū; 14th: jū yon	P	CS_P
ji (次; 'ordinal occurrence')		14th; 15th: /ʑɯ́R {jo;ɡo}-ʑi ~ ʑɯ́R | {jó;ɡó}-ʑi/	XP	CS_P
jigen (次元; 'dimension')	/ʑiɡeN/	1; 2; 3; 5; 6; 8; 9; 10: SJ; 4: yo; 7: SJ ~ N	+1	CSL_+1
ji (字; 'written character')	/ʑí/	1; 2; 3; 5; 6; 8; 10; 11; 12; 13; 16; 18; 20: SJ; 4; nan: N; 7; 17: (jū) {nana;shichi}; 9; 19: (jū) kyū; 14: jū yon	P	CS_P
ji (字; 'written character')	/ʑí/	14; 15: /ʑɯ́R {jo;ɡo}-ʑi ~ ʑɯ́R | {jó;ɡó}-ʑi/	XP	CS_P
ji (時; 'ordinal hour of the day ~ cardinal hour')	/ʑí/	0; 1; 2; 3; 5; 6; 7; 8; 10; 11; 12; 13; 16; 17; 18: SJ; 4: yo; 9: ku; nan	P	CS_P
ji (時; 'ordinal hour of the day ~ cardinal hour')	/ʑí/	14; 15; 19: /ʑɯ́R {jo;ɡo;kɯ}-ʑi ~ ʑɯ́R | {jó;ɡó;kɯ́}-ʑi/	XP	CS_P
ji (時; 'ordinal hour of the day ~ cardinal hour')	/ʑí/	20: SJ	P ~ R	CS_P
ji (時; 'ordinal hour of the day ~ cardinal hour')	/ʑí/	iku: /íkɯ-ʑi/	PP	CS_P
jikan (時間; 'cardinal hour')	/ʑikaN/	1; 2; 3; 5; 6; 8; 9; 10; 11; 12; 13; 15; 16; 18; 19; 20; 30; 50; 60; 80; 90; 100; 1,000; 10,000: SJ; 4: yo; 7; 17: (jū) {shichi;nana}; 14: jū yo(n); 40; 70: NSJ; nan	+1	CSL_+1
jikan (時間; 'cardinal hour')	/ʑikaN/	24; 34; 44; 74; 94: /{ní;sáN;jóN;naná;kjɯ́R}-ʑɯR jo-ʑikaN ~ {ní;sáN;jóN;naná;kjɯ́R}-ʑɯR | jo-ʑíkaN/; 54; 64; 84: /{ɡo;ɾokɯ;hacɕi}-ʑɯR (|) jo-ʑíkaN/	X+1	CSL_+1
jikanme (時間目; 'ordinal hour in general ~ ordinal school period')		1st; 2nd; 3rd; 5th; 6th; 8th; 9th; 10th; 11th; 12th; 13th; 15th; 16th; 18th; 19th; 20th; 30th; 50th; 60th; 80th; 90th; 100th; 1,000th; 10,000th: SJ; 4th: yo; 7th; 17th: (jū) {shichi;nana}; 14th: jū yo(n); 40th; 70th: NSJ; nan	−1	CSL_−1
jikanme (時間目; 'ordinal hour in general ~ ordinal school period')		24th; 34th; 44th; 74th; 94th: /{ní;sáN;jóN;naná;kjɯ́R}-ʑɯR jo-ʑikaN-me ~ {ní;sáN;jóN;naná;kjɯ́R}-ʑɯR | jo-ʑikaN-mé/; 54th; 64th; 84th: /{ɡo;ɾokɯ;hacɕi}-ʑɯR (|) jo-ʑikaN-mé/	X−1	CSL_−1
jikango (時間後; 'hour later')		1; 2; 3; 5; 6; 8; 9; 10; 11; 12; 13; 15; 16; 18; 19; 20; 30; 50; 60; 80; 90; 100; 1,000; 10,000: SJ; 4: yo; 7; 17: (jū) {shichi;nana}; 14: jū yo(n); 40; 70: NSJ; nan	−1	CSL_−1
jikango (時間後; 'hour later')		24; 34; 44; 74; 94: /{ní;sáN;jóN;naná;kjɯ́R}-ʑɯR jo-ʑikaN-ɡo ~ {ní;sáN;jóN;naná;kjɯ́R}-ʑɯR | jo-ʑikaN-ɡó/; 54; 64; 84: /{ɡo;ɾokɯ;hacɕi}-ʑɯR (|) jo-ʑikaN-ɡó/	X−1	CSL_−1
jigen (時限; 'school period')	/ʑiɡeN ~ ʑíɡeN/	1; 2; 3; 5; 6; 7; 8; 9; 10: SJ; 4: yo	+1	CSL_+1
shiai (試合; 'competition ~ contest ~ tournament ~ sport match')	/ɕiai/	1: /{iQ;hi̥to}-ɕíai/; 2: SJ ~ N; 3; 5; 12; 13; 15: SJ; 4; 14: (jū) yon; 6; 16: /(ʑɯR) ɾokɯ̥-ɕíai/; 7; 17: (jū) nana; 8; 18: /(ʑɯR) hacɕi̥-ɕíai → (ʑɯR) haQ-ɕíai/; 9; 19: (jū) kyū; 10; 20: /(ni-){ʑiQ;ʑɯQ}-ɕíai/; 11: /ʑɯR iQ-ɕíai/; nan; dai 1: /dai icɕi̥-ɕíai/	+1	CSL_+1
shīshī (cc)	/ɕiRɕíR/	1; 11: /(ʑɯR) icɕi̥-ɕiRɕíR/; 2; 3; 5; 12; 13; 15: SJ; 4; 14: (jū) yon; 6; 16: /(ʑɯR) ɾokɯ̥-ɕiRɕíR/; 7; 17: (jū) {nana;shichi}; 8; 18: /(ʑɯR) hacɕi̥-ɕiRɕíR → (ʑɯR) haQ-ɕiRɕíR/; 9; 19: (jū) kyū; 10; 20: /(ni-){ʑiQ;ʑɯQ}-ɕiRɕíR/; nan; iku: /ikɯ̥-ɕiRɕíR/	−2	CL_M
shīzun (シーズン; 'season')	/ɕíRzɯN/	1: /{icɕi̥-ɕíRzɯN → iQ-ɕíRzɯN} ~ hi̥to-ɕíRzɯN/; 2: SJ ~ N; 3; 5; 12; 13; 15: SJ; 4; 14: (jū) yon; 6; 16: /ɾokɯ̥-ɕíRzɯN/; 7; 17: (jū) nana; 8; 18: /hacɕi̥-ɕíRzɯN → haQ-ɕíRzɯN/; 9; 19: (jū) kyū; 10: /{ʑiQ;ʑɯQ}-ɕíRzɯN/; 11: /ʑɯR icɕi̥-ɕíRzɯN → ʑɯR iQ-ɕíRzɯN/; nan	+1	CSL_+1
shīto (シート; 'sheet')	/ɕíRto/	1; 11: /(ʑɯR) icɕi̥-ɕíRto/; 2; 3; 5; 12; 13; 15: SJ; 4; 14: (jū) yon; 6; 16: /(ʑɯR) ɾokɯ̥-ɕíRto/; 7; 17: (jū) nana; 8; 18: /(ʑɯR) hacɕi̥-ɕíRto/; 9; 19: (jū) kyū; 10; 20: /(ni-){ʑiQ;ʑɯQ}-ɕíRto/; nan	+1	CSL_+1
shīberuto (シーベルト; 'sievert')	/ɕíRbeɾɯto/	1; 11: /(ʑɯR) icɕi̥-ɕíRbeɾɯto/; 2; 3; 5; 12; 13; 15: SJ; 4; 14: (jū) yon; 6; 16: /(ʑɯR) ɾokɯ̥-ɕíRbeɾɯto/; 7; 17: (jū) nana; 8; 18: /(ʑɯR) hacɕi̥-ɕíRbeɾɯto/; 9; 19: (jū) kyū; 10; 20: /(ni-){ʑiQ;ʑɯQ}-ɕíRbeɾɯto/; nan	+1	CSL_+1
shitsu (室; 'room')	/ɕi̥tsɯ́/	1: /iQ-{ɕi̥tsɯ́;ɕi̥tsɯ}/	−1 ~ D	CS_P_−1SJQK*
shitsu (室; 'room')	/ɕi̥tsɯ́/	2; 3; 5; 12; 13; 100: SJ; 4; 14: (jū) yon; 7; 17: (jū) nana; 9; 19: (jū) kyū; 20; 30; 40; 50; 60; 70; 80; 90: /{ni;saN;joN;ɡo;ɾokɯ;nana;hacɕi;kjɯR}-{ʑíQ;ʑɯ́Q}-ɕi̥tsɯ/; 1,000: sen; nan	P	CS_P_−1SJQK*
shitsu (室; 'room')	/ɕi̥tsɯ́/	6; 16: SJ	−1 ~ P	CS_P_−1SJQK*
shitsu (室; 'room')	/ɕi̥tsɯ́/	8; 18: /(ʑɯR) haQ-ɕi̥tsɯ́/; 10: /{ʑiQ;ʑɯQ}-ɕi̥tsɯ́/; 11: /ʑɯR iQ-ɕi̥tsɯ́/	−1	CS_P_−1SJQK*
shitsu (室; 'room')	/ɕi̥tsɯ́/	15: /ʑɯ́R ɡo-ɕi̥tsɯ ~ ʑɯ́R | ɡó-ɕi̥tsɯ/	XP	CS_P_−1SJQK*
shitsu (室; 'room')	/ɕi̥tsɯ́/	21; 31; 41; 71; 91: /{ní;sáN;jóN;naná;kjɯ́R}-ʑɯR iQ-ɕi̥tsɯ ~ {ní;sáN;jóN;naná;kjɯ́R}-ʑɯR | iQ-ɕi̥tsɯ́/; 51; 61; 81: /{ɡo;ɾokɯ;hacɕi}-ʑɯR (|) iQ-ɕi̥tsɯ́/	X−1	CS_P_−1SJQK*
shitsu (室; 'room')	/ɕi̥tsɯ́/	10,000: SJ	D	CS_P_−1SJQK*
shina (品; 'menu dish')	/ɕina/	1; 2; 4; nan: N; 3: N ~ SJ; 5; 12; 13: SJ; 6; 16: /(ʑɯR) ɾokɯ̥́-ɕina/; 7; 17: (jū) nana; 8; 18: /(ʑɯR) hacɕí̥-ɕina → (ʑɯR) háQ-ɕina/; 9; 19: (jū) kyū; 10; 20: /(ni-){ʑíQ;ʑɯ́Q}-ɕina/; 11: /ʑɯR icɕí̥-ɕina/; 14: jū yon	P	CS_P
shina (品; 'menu dish')	/ɕina/	14; 15: /ʑɯ́R {jo;ɡo}-ɕina ~ ʑɯ́R | {jó;ɡó}-ɕina/	XP	CS_P
sha (社; 'Shinto shrine ~ company')	/ɕá/	1; 11: /(ʑɯR) íQ-ɕa/; 2; 3; 5; 12; 13: SJ; 4; 14: (jū) yon; 6; 16: /(ʑɯR) ɾokɯ̥́-ɕa/; 7; 17: (jū) nana; 8; 18: /(ʑɯR) hacɕí̥-ɕa → (ʑɯR) háQ-ɕa/; 9; 19: (jū) kyū; 10; 20: /(ni-){ʑíQ;ʑɯ́Q}-ɕa/; nan	P	CS_P
sha (社; 'Shinto shrine ~ company')	/ɕá/	15: /ʑɯ́R ɡo-ɕa ~ ʑɯ́R | ɡó-ɕa/	XP	CS_P
shaku (尺; 'shaku ~ fish')	/ɕakɯ́/	1; 11: /(ʑɯR) iQ-ɕakɯ́/; 2; 5; 7; 12; 17: SJ; 6; 16: /(ʑɯR) ɾokɯ̥-ɕakɯ́/; 8; 18: /(ʑɯR) haQ-ɕakɯ́/; 10: /{ʑiQ;ʑɯQ}-ɕakɯ́/	−1	CS_P_−1SJ!+1!0!Sen (Note: Excluding kushaku which is rare.)
shaku (尺; 'shaku ~ fish')	/ɕakɯ́/	3; 13: /(ʑɯR) sáN-ʑakɯ/; 4; 14: (jū) yon; 7; 17: (jū) nana; 9: /{kjɯ́R;kɯ̥́}-ɕakɯ/; 19: /ʑɯR kjɯ́R-ɕakɯ/; 20: /ni-{ʑíQ;ʑɯ́Q}-ɕakɯ/; nan: /náN-ʑakɯ/	P	CS_P_−1SJ!+1!0!Sen
shaku (尺; 'shaku ~ fish')	/ɕakɯ́/	15: /ʑɯ́R ɡo-ɕakɯ ~ ʑɯ́R | ɡo-ɕakɯ́/	X−1	CS_P_−1SJ!+1!0!Sen
shaku (尺; 'shaku ~ fish')	/ɕakɯ́/	iku: /íkɯ̥-ɕakɯ ~ ikɯ̥-ɕakɯ́/	PP ~ −1	CS_P_−1SJ!+1!0!Sen
shasen (車線; 'traffic lane')	/ɕaseN/	1: /iQ-ɕáseN/; 2; 3; 5: SJ; 4: yon; 6: /ɾokɯ̥-ɕáseN/; 7: N; 8: /hacɕi̥-ɕáseN → haQ-ɕáseN/; 9: kyū; 10: /{ʑiQ;ʑɯQ}-ɕáseN/	+1	CSL_+1
shu (首; 'East-Asian poem')	/ɕɯ́/	1; 11: /(ʑɯR) íQ-ɕɯ/; 2; 3; 5; 12; 13: SJ; 4; 14: (jū) yon; 6; 16: /(ʑɯR) ɾokɯ̥́-ɕɯ/; 7; 17: (jū) nana; 8; 18: /(ʑɯR) hacɕí̥-ɕɯ → (ʑɯR) háQ-ɕɯ/; 9; 19: (jū) kyū; 10; 20: /(ni-){ʑíQ;ʑɯ́Q}-ɕɯ/; nan	P	CS_P*
shu (首; 'East-Asian poem')	/ɕɯ́/	15: /ʑɯ́R ɡo-ɕɯ → ʑɯ́R | ɡó-ɕɯ/	XP	CS_P*
shu (首; 'East-Asian poem')	/ɕɯ́/	100: /hjakɯ̥́-ɕɯ ~ hjákɯ̥-ɕɯ/	P ~ PP	CS_P*
shu (種; 'type ~ variety ~ species')	/ɕɯ́/	1; 11: /(ʑɯR) íQ-ɕɯ/; 2; 3; 5; 12; 13: SJ; 4; 14: (jū) yon; 6; 16: /(ʑɯR) ɾokɯ̥́-ɕɯ/; 7; 17: (jū) nana; 8; 18: /(ʑɯR) hacɕí̥-ɕɯ → (ʑɯR) háQ-ɕɯ/; 9; 19: (jū) kyū; 10; 20: /(ni-){ʑíQ;ʑɯ́Q}-ɕɯ/; nan	P	CS_P
shu (種; 'type ~ variety ~ species')	/ɕɯ́/	15: /ʑɯ́R ɡo-ɕɯ → ʑɯ́R | ɡó-ɕɯ/	XP	CS_P
shumoku (種目; 'categorized item ~ sporting event')	/ɕɯmokɯ ~ ɕɯ́mokɯ/	1; 11: /(ʑɯR) iQ-ɕɯ́mokɯ/; 2; 3; 5; 12; 13; 15: SJ; 4; 14: (jū) yon; 6; 16: /(ʑɯR) ɾokɯ̥-ɕɯ́mokɯ/; 7; 17: (jū) nana; 8; 18: /(ʑɯR) hacɕi̥-ɕɯ́mokɯ → (ʑɯR) haQ-ɕɯ́mokɯ/; 9; 19: (jū) kyū; 10; 20: /(ni-){ʑiQ;ʑɯQ}-ɕɯ́mokɯ/; nan	+1	CSL_+1
shurui (種類; 'type ~ variety ~ species')	/ɕɯ́ɾɯi/	1: /{iQ;hi̥to}-ɕɯ́ɾɯi/; 2: SJ ~ N; 3; 5; 12; 13; 15: SJ; 4; 14: (jū) yon; 6; 16: /(ʑɯR) ɾokɯ̥-ɕɯ́ɾɯi/; 7; 17: (jū) nana; 8; 18: /(ʑɯR) hacɕi̥-ɕɯ́ɾɯi → (ʑɯR) haQ-ɕɯ́ɾɯi/; 9; 19: (jū) kyū; 10; 20: /(ni-){ʑiQ;ʑɯQ}-ɕɯ́ɾɯi/; 11: /ʑɯR iQ-ɕɯ́ɾɯi/; nan	+1	CSL_+1
shū (周; 'circling lap') shū (週; 'week')	/ɕɯ́R/	1; 11: /(ʑɯR) iQ-ɕɯR/; 2; 3; 5; 12; 13; 15; han: SJ; 4; 14: (jū) yon; 6; 16: /(ʑɯR) ɾokɯ̥-ɕɯR/; 7; 17: (jū) nana; 8; 18: /(ʑɯR) haQ-ɕɯR/; 9; 19: (jū) kyū; 10; 20: /(ni-){ʑiQ;ʑɯQ}-ɕɯR/; nan	D	CSL_D
shūnen (周年; 'anniversary year')	/ɕɯRneN/	1; 11: /(ʑɯR) iQ-ɕɯ́RneN/; 2; 3; 5; 12; 13; 15: SJ; 4; 14: (jū) yon; 6; 16: /(ʑɯR) ɾokɯ̥-ɕɯ́RneN/; 7; 17: (jū) {nana;shichi}; 8; 18: /(ʑɯR) hacɕi̥-ɕɯ́RneN → (ʑɯR) haQ-ɕɯ́RneN/; 9; 19: (jū) kyū; 10; 20: /(ni-){ʑiQ;ʑɯQ}-ɕɯ́RneN/; nan	+1	CSL_+1
jū (重; 'layer ~ tier ~ storey')	/ʑɯ́R/	1; 2; 3; 5; 6; 8; 9; 10: SJ; 4: yon; 7: N ~ SJ; nan	D	CSL_D
jun (巡; 'rotation through a roster')		1; 2; 3; 5; 6; 8; 10; 11; 12; 13; 15; 16; 18; 20: SJ; 4; 14: (jū) yon; 7; 17: (jū) nana; 9; 19: (jū) kyū; nan	D	CSL_D
jo (女; 'ordinal daughter') (Note: The eldest daughter is chōjo (長女; /cɕóRʑo/).)	/ʑó/	2nd: ji (Note: Alternatively spelt 次.); 3rd; 5th; 6th; 7th; 8th; 10th: SJ; 4th: yon; 9th: kyū	P	CS_P
jo (女; 'cardinal daughter')	/ʑó/	1; 2; 3; 5; 6; 8; 10: SJ; 4: yon; 7: SJ ~ N; 9: kyū	P	CS_P
shō (勝; 'win')	/ɕóR/	1: /iQ-ɕoR/; 2; 3; 5: SJ; 4: yon; 6: /ɾokɯ̥-ɕoR/; 7: nana; 8: /haQ-ɕoR/; 9: kyū; 10: /{ʑiQ;ʑɯQ}-ɕoR/	D	CSL_D* ~ CS_D_PnJ* ~ CS_D_PJnJ
shō (勝; 'win')	/ɕóR/	11: /ʑɯR {iQ;íQ}-ɕoR/; 12; 13: SJ; 14: jū yon; 16: /ʑɯR {ɾokɯ̥;ɾokɯ̥́}-ɕoR/; 17: jū nana; 18: /ʑɯR {haQ;háQ}-ɕoR/; 19: jū kyū; 20: /ni-{ʑiQ;ʑɯQ;ʑíQ;ʑɯ́Q}-ɕoR/; nan	D ~ P	CSL_D* ~ CS_D_PnJ* ~ CS_D_PJnJ
shō (勝; 'win')	/ɕóR/	15: /ʑɯR ɡo-ɕoR ~ ʑɯ́R (|) ɡo-ɕoR/	D ~ XD	CSL_D* ~ CS_D_PnJ* ~ CS_D_PJnJ
shō (章; 'chapter') shō (床; 'sickbed')	/ɕóR/	1; 11: /(ʑɯR) íQ-ɕoR/; 2; 3; 5; 12; 13: SJ; 4; 14: (jū) yon; 6; 16: /(ʑɯR) ɾokɯ̥́-ɕoR/; 7; 17: (jū) nana; 8; 18: /(ʑɯR) háQ-ɕoR/; 9; 19: (jū) kyū; 10; 20: /(ni-){ʑíQ;ʑɯ́Q}-ɕoR/; nan	P	CS_P
shō (章; 'chapter') shō (床; 'sickbed')	/ɕóR/	15: /ʑɯ́R ɡo-ɕoR ~ ʑɯ́R | ɡó-ɕoR/	XP	CS_P
shō (升)	/ɕóR/	1; 11: /(ʑɯR) íQ-ɕoR/; 2; 12; 13: SJ; 4; 14: (jū) yon; 7; 17: (jū) nana; 8; 18: /(ʑɯR) háQ-ɕoR/; 9; 19: (jū) kyū; 10; 20: /(ni-){ʑíQ;ʑɯ́Q}-ɕoR/; 16: /ʑɯR ɾokɯ̥́-ɕoR/; nan	P	CS_P*
shō (升)	/ɕóR/	3: /sáN-ɕoR ~ saN-ʑoR/; 5: SJ	P ~ D	CS_P*
shō (升)	/ɕóR/	6: /ɾokɯ̥́-ɕoR → ɾokɯ̥-ɕóR/	P → +1	CS_P*
shō (升)	/ɕóR/	15: /ʑɯ́R ɡo-ɕoR ~ ʑɯ́R | ɡó-ɕoR/	XP	CS_P*
jō (錠; 'pill')	/ʑóR/	1; 2; 3; 5; 6; 8; 10; 11; 12; 13; 16; 18; 20: SJ; 4; nan: N; 7; 17: (jū) nana; 9; 19: (jū) kyū; 14: jū yon	P	CS_P
jō (錠; 'pill')	/ʑóR/	15: /ʑɯ́R ɡo-ʑoR ~ ʑɯ́R | ɡó-ʑoR/	XP	CS_P
jō (条; 'legal section/clause/article ~ long and thin object') (Note: Shijō, yojō, shichijō and kujō are mostly used in proper names.)	/ʑóR/	1; 2; 3; 5; 6; 8; 10; 11; 12; 13; 16; 18; 20: SJ; 4; 14: (jū) {yon;shi}; 7; 17: (jū) {nana;shichi}; 9; 19: (jū) kyū; nan	P	CS_P
jō (条; 'legal section/clause/article ~ long and thin object')	/ʑóR/	14; 15; 19: /ʑɯ́R {jo;ɡo;kɯ}-ʑoR ~ ʑɯ́R | {jó;ɡó;kɯ́}-ʑoR/	XP	CS_P
jō (畳; 'tatami')		1; 2; 3; 5; 6; 8; 9; 10; 11; 12; 13; 16; 18; 20: SJ; 4: N (Note: '4.5 tatami' is only yojōhan (四畳半; /jo-ʑóR-haN/).); 7; 17: (jū) nana; 14; 19: jū {yon;kyū}; nan	P ~ +1	CS_P* ~ CSL_+1* ~ CS_P_+1S!+1* ~ CS_P_+1S!+1!0* ~ CS_P_+1SJ*
jō (畳; 'tatami')		14; 15: /ʑɯ́R {jo;ɡo}-ʑoR ~ ʑɯ́R | {{jó;ɡó}-ʑoR;{jo;ɡo}-ʑóR}/	XP ~ X+1	CS_P* ~ CSL_+1* ~ CS_P_+1S!+1* ~ CS_P_+1S!+1!0* ~ CS_P_+1SJ*
jō (畳; 'tatami')		han	P ~ +1 ~ D	CS_P* ~ CSL_+1* ~ CS_P_+1S!+1* ~ CS_P_+1S!+1!0* ~ CS_P_+1SJ*
jō (乗; 'ordinal exponent')	/ʑóR/	1st; 3rd; 5th; 6th; 8th; 10th; 11th; 12th; 13th; 15th; 16th; 18th; 20th: SJ; 2nd: ni ~ ji (Note: Alternatively spelt 自.); 4th; 14th: (jū) yon; 7th; 17th: (jū) nana; 9th; 19th: (jū) kyū; nan	D	CSL_D
shoku (食; 'meal')	/ɕokɯ/	1: /iQ-ɕokɯ́/; 10: /{ʑiQ;ʑɯQ}-ɕokɯ́/	−1	CS_P_−1SJQK*
shoku (食; 'meal')	/ɕokɯ/	2; 3; 5; 12; 13: SJ; 4; 14: (jū) yon; 7; 17: (jū) nana; 9; 19: (jū) kyū; 20: /ni-{ʑíQ;ʑɯ́Q}-ɕokɯ/; nan	P	CS_P_−1SJQK*
shoku (食; 'meal')	/ɕokɯ/	6; 16: /(ʑɯR) {ɾokɯ̥-ɕokɯ́;ɾokɯ̥́-ɕokɯ}/; 8; 18: /(ʑɯR) {haQ-ɕokɯ́;háQ-ɕokɯ}/; 11: /ʑɯR {iQ-ɕokɯ́;íQ-ɕokɯ}/	−1 ~ P	CS_P_−1SJQK*
shoku (食; 'meal')	/ɕokɯ/	15: /ʑɯ́R ɡo-ɕokɯ ~ ʑɯ́R | ɡó-ɕokɯ/	XP	CS_P_−1SJQK*
shoku (色; 'color')		1: /iQ-ɕokɯ́/; 10: /{ʑiQ;ʑɯQ}-ɕokɯ́/	−1	CS_P_−1SJQK*
shoku (色; 'color')		2; 3; 5; 12; 13: SJ; 4; 14: (jū) yon; 7; 17: (jū) nana; 9; 19: (jū) kyū; 20: /ni-{ʑíQ;ʑɯ́Q}-ɕokɯ/; nan	P	CS_P_−1SJQK*
shoku (色; 'color')		6; 16: /(ʑɯR) {ɾokɯ̥-ɕokɯ́;ɾokɯ̥́-ɕokɯ}/; 8; 18: /(ʑɯR) {haQ-ɕokɯ́;háQ-ɕokɯ}/; 11: /ʑɯR {iQ-ɕokɯ́;íQ-ɕokɯ}/	−1 ~ P	CS_P_−1SJQK*
shoku (色; 'color')		15: /ʑɯ́R ɡo-ɕokɯ ~ ʑɯ́R | ɡó-ɕokɯ/	XP	CS_P_−1SJQK*
shin (審; 'court hearing')		1: /iQ-ɕiN/; 2; 3; 5: SJ; 4: yon; 6: /ɾokɯ̥-ɕiN/; 7: N; 8: /haQ-ɕiN/; 9: kyū; 10: /{ʑiQ;ʑɯQ}-ɕiN/	D	CSL_D
sun (寸)	/sɯ́N/	1: /iQ-sɯ́N ~ íQ-sɯN/; 2; 5: SJ; 6: /ɾokɯ̥-sɯ́N ~ ɾokɯ̥́-sɯN/; 8: /haQ-sɯ́N ~ háQ-sɯN/; 10: /{ʑiQ;ʑɯQ}-sɯ́N ~ {ʑíQ;ʑɯ́Q}-sɯN/	+1 ~ P	CS_P_+1S!+1!0* ~ CS_P* (Note: Excluding shichisun and kusun which are rare.)
sun (寸)	/sɯ́N/	3: /sáN-zɯN/; 4: yon; 7: N; 9: kyū; nan: /náN-zɯN/	P	CS_P_+1S!+1!0* ~ CS_P*
sun (寸)	/sɯ́N/	7: SJ; 9: /kɯ̥-sɯ́N/	+1	CS_P_+1S!+1!0* ~ CS_P*
seiki (世紀; 'century')	/séiki/	1; 11: /(ʑɯR) iQ-séiki/; 2; 3; 5; 12; 13; 15; han: SJ; 4; 14: (jū) yon; 6; 16: /(ʑɯR) ɾokɯ̥-séiki/; 7; 17: (jū) nana; 8; 18: /(ʑɯR) haQ-séiki/; 9; 19: (jū) kyū; 10; 20: /(ni-){ʑiQ;ʑɯQ}-séiki/; nan	+1	CSL_+1
setai (世帯; 'household')	/setái ~ sétai/	1: /{icɕi̥-sétai → iQ-sétai} ~ hi̥to-sétai/; 2: SJ ~ N; 3; 5; 12; 13; 15; 1,000; 10,000: SJ; 4; 14: (jū) yon; 6; 16: /(ʑɯR) ɾokɯ̥-sétai/; 7; 17: (jū) nana; 8; 18: /(ʑɯR) hacɕi̥-sétai → (ʑɯR) haQ-sétai/; 9; 19: (jū) kyū; 10; 20; 30; 40; 50; 60; 70; 80; 90: /({ni;saN;joN;ɡo;ɾokɯ;nana;hacɕi;kjɯR}-){ʑiQ;ʑɯQ}-sétai/; 11: /ʑɯR icɕi̥-sétai → ʑɯR iQ-sétai/; 100: /hjakɯ̥-sétai/; nan	+1	CSL_+1
setai (世帯; 'household')	/setái ~ sétai/	21; 31; 41; 71; 91: /{{ní;sáN;jóN;naná;kjɯ́R}-ʑɯR icɕi̥-setai → {ní;sáN;jóN;naná;kjɯ́R}-ʑɯR iQ-setai} ~ {{ní;sáN;jóN;naná;kjɯ́R}-ʑɯR | icɕi̥-sétai → {ní;sáN;jóN;naná;kjɯ́R}-ʑɯR | iQ-sétai}/; 22; 32; 42; 72; 92: /{ní;sáN;jóN;naná;kjɯ́R}-ʑɯR ni-setai ~ {ní;sáN;jóN;naná;kjɯ́R}-ʑɯR | ni-sétai}/; 51; 61; 81: /{ɡo;ɾokɯ;hacɕi}-ʑɯR (|) icɕi̥-sétai → {ɡo;ɾokɯ;hacɕi}-ʑɯR (|) iQ-sétai}/; 52; 62; 82: /{ɡo;ɾokɯ;hacɕi}-ʑɯR (|) ni-sétai}/	X+1	CSL_+1
seki (隻; 'large ship ~ fish ~ bird ~ arrow ~ paired object')		1; 11: /(ʑɯR) iQ-sekí/; 10: /{ʑiQ;ʑɯQ}-sekí/	−1	CS_P_−1SJQK*
seki (隻; 'large ship ~ fish ~ bird ~ arrow ~ paired object')		2; 3; 5; 12; 13: SJ; 4; 14: (jū) yon; 7; 17: (jū) nana; 9; 19: (jū) kyū; 20; 30; 40; 50; 60; 70; 80; 90: /{ni;saN;joN;ɡo;ɾokɯ;nana;hacɕi;kjɯR}-{ʑíQ;ʑɯ́Q}-seki/; 1,000: sen; nan	P	CS_P_−1SJQK*
seki (隻; 'large ship ~ fish ~ bird ~ arrow ~ paired object')		6; 16: /(ʑɯR) {ɾokɯ̥́-seki;ɾokɯ̥-sekí}/; 8; 18: /(ʑɯR) {haQ-sekí;háQ-seki}/; 100: /(ʑɯR) {hjakɯ̥́-seki;hjakɯ̥-sekí}/	P ~ −1	CS_P_−1SJQK*
seki (隻; 'large ship ~ fish ~ bird ~ arrow ~ paired object')		15: /ʑɯ́R ɡo-seki ~ ʑɯ́R | ɡó-seki/	XP	CS_P_−1SJQK*
seki (隻; 'large ship ~ fish ~ bird ~ arrow ~ paired object')		10,000: SJ	D	CS_P_−1SJQK*
setsu (節; 'section of text')	/sétsɯ/	1: /iQ-setsɯ́ ~ iQ-setsɯ/	−1 ~ D	CS_P_−1SJQK*
setsu (節; 'section of text')	/sétsɯ/	2; 3; 5; 12; 13: SJ; 4; 14: (jū) yon; 7; 17: (jū) nana; 9; 19: (jū) kyū; 20: /ni-{ʑíQ;ʑɯ́Q}-setsɯ/	P	CS_P_−1SJQK*
setsu (節; 'section of text')	/sétsɯ/	6; 16: /(ʑɯR) ɾokɯ̥-setsɯ́/; 8; 18: /(ʑɯR) haQ-setsɯ́/; 10: /{ʑiQ;ʑɯQ}-setsɯ́/; 11: /ʑɯR iQ-setsɯ́/	−1	CS_P_−1SJQK*
setsu (節; 'section of text')	/sétsɯ/	15: /ʑɯ́R ɡo-setsɯ ~ ʑɯ́R | ɡó-setsɯ/	XP	CS_P_−1SJQK*
setsu (節; 'sport round')	/sétsɯ/	1; 11: /(ʑɯR) iQ-setsɯ́/; 6; 16: /(ʑɯR) ɾokɯ̥-setsɯ́/; 8; 18: /(ʑɯR) haQ-setsɯ́/; 10: /{ʑiQ;ʑɯQ}-setsɯ́/	−1	CS_P_−1SJQK
setsu (節; 'sport round')	/sétsɯ/	2; 3; 5; 12; 13: SJ; 4; 14: (jū) yon; 7; 17: (jū) nana; 9; 19: (jū) kyū; 20: /ni-{ʑíQ;ʑɯ́Q}-setsɯ/	P	CS_P_−1SJQK
setsu (節; 'sport round')	/sétsɯ/	15: /ʑɯ́R ɡo-setsɯ ~ ʑɯ́R | ɡó-setsɯ/	XP	CS_P_−1SJQK
setto (セット; 'set')	/séQto/	1: /{icɕi̥-séQto → iQ-séQto} ~ hi̥to-séQto/; 2: SJ ~ N; 3; 5; 12; 13; 15: SJ; 4; 14: (jū) yon; 6; 16: /(ʑɯR) ɾokɯ̥-séQto/; 7; 17: (jū) nana; 8; 18: /(ʑɯR) hacɕi̥-séQto → (ʑɯR) haQ-séQto/; 9; 19: (jū) kyū; 10; 20: /(ni-){ʑiQ;ʑɯQ}-séQto/; 11: /ʑɯR icɕi̥-séQto → ʑɯR iQ-séQto/; nan	+1	CSL_+1
sen (選; 'time when a person/thing's (s)elected')	/séN/	1; 11: /(ʑɯR) iQ-seN/; 2; 3; 5; 12; 13; 15: SJ; 4; 14: (jū) yon; 6; 16: /(ʑɯR) ɾokɯ̥-seN/; 7; 17: (jū) nana; 8; 18: /(ʑɯR) haQ-seN/; 9; 19: (jū) kyū; 10: /{ʑiQ;ʑɯQ}-seN/; nan	D	CS_D_PnJ
sen (選; 'time when a person/thing's (s)elected')	/séN/	20: /ni-{ʑíQ;ʑɯ́Q}-seN/	P	CS_D_PnJ
sen (選; '(s)elected person/thing')	/séN/	2; 3; 5; 12; 13; 15: SJ; 4; 14: (jū) yon; 6; 16: /(ʑɯR) ɾokɯ̥́-seN/; 7; 17: (jū) nana; 8; 18: /(ʑɯR) háQ-seN/; 9; 19: (jū) kyū; 10; 20: /(ni-){ʑíQ;ʑɯ́Q}-seN/; 11: /ʑɯR íQ-seN/; 100: /hjakɯ̥́-seN/; nan	P	CS_P
sen (選; '(s)elected person/thing')	/séN/	15: /ʑɯ́R ɡo-seN ~ ʑɯ́R | ɡó-seN/	XP	CS_P
sen (戦; 'battle ~ sport match')		1: /iQ-seN/; 2; 3; 5: SJ; 4: yon; 6: /ɾokɯ̥-seN/; 7; nan: N; 8: /haQ-seN/; 9: kyū; 10: /{ʑiQ;ʑɯQ}-seN/; 100: /hjakɯ̥-seN/	D	CS_D_PnJ* ~ CS_D_PJnJ
sen (戦; 'battle ~ sport match')		11: /ʑɯR {iQ;íQ}-seN/; 12; 13: SJ; 14: jū yon; 16: /ʑɯR {ɾokɯ̥;ɾokɯ̥́}-seN/; 17: jū nana; 18: /ʑɯR {haQ;háQ}-seN/; 19: jū kyū	D ~ P	CS_D_PnJ* ~ CS_D_PJnJ
sen (戦; 'battle ~ sport match')		15: /{ʑɯR;ʑɯ́R} ɡo-seN ~ ʑɯ́R | ɡó-seN/	D ~ XP	CS_D_PnJ* ~ CS_D_PJnJ
sen (戦; 'battle ~ sport match')		20: /ni-{ʑíQ;ʑɯ́Q}-seN/	P	CS_D_PnJ* ~ CS_D_PJnJ
sen (銭; 'Japanese cent')	/séN/	1; 11: /(ʑɯR) {íQ-seN;iQ-séN}/; 2; 3; 5; 12; 13: SJ; 4; 14: (jū) yon; 6; 16: /(ʑɯR) {ɾokɯ̥́-seN;ɾokɯ̥-séN}/; 7; 17: (jū) {nana;shichi}; 8; 18: /(ʑɯR) {háQ-seN;haQ-séN}/; 10: /{ʑíQ;ʑɯ́Q}-seN ~ {ʑiQ;ʑɯQ}-séN/; nan	P ~ +1	CS_P* ~ CS_P_+1S!+1* ~ CS_P_+1S!+1!0*
sen (銭; 'Japanese cent')	/séN/	9; 19: (jū) kyū; han	P	CS_P* ~ CS_P_+1S!+1* ~ CS_P_+1S!+1!0*
sen (銭; 'Japanese cent')	/séN/	15: /ʑɯ́R ɡo-seN ~ ʑɯ́R | {ɡó-seN;ɡo-séN}/	XP ~ X+1	CS_P* ~ CS_P_+1S!+1* ~ CS_P_+1S!+1!0*
sen (銭; 'Japanese cent')	/séN/	20: /{ni-{ʑíQ;ʑɯ́Q};ní-{ʑiQ;ʑɯQ}}-seN/	P ~ R	CS_P* ~ CS_P_+1S!+1* ~ CS_P_+1S!+1!0*
sen (銭; 'Japanese cent')	/séN/	iku: /íkɯ̥-seN/	PP	CS_P* ~ CS_P_+1S!+1* ~ CS_P_+1S!+1!0*
sen (千; 'thousand')	/séN/	1: /(iQ-)séN/; 2; 7: SJ ~ N; 3: /saN-zéN/; 4: yon; 5: SJ; 6: /ɾokɯ̥-séN/; 8: /haQ-séN/; 9: kyū	+1	CSL_+1
sen (千; 'thousand')	/séN/	nan: /naN-zéN ~ náN-zeN/	+1 ~ P	CSL_+1
sen (千; 'thousand')	/séN/	iku: /ikɯ̥-séN ~ íkɯ̥-seN/	+1 ~ PP	CSL_+1
zen (膳; 'bowl of food ~ pair of chopsticks')	/zeN/	1; 2; 3; 5; 6; 8; 10; 11; 12; 13; 16; 18; 20: SJ; 4; 14: (jū) yon; 7; 17: (jū) nana; 9; 19: (jū) kyū; nan	P	CS_P
zen (膳; 'bowl of food ~ pair of chopsticks')	/zeN/	15: /ʑɯ́R ɡo-zeN ~ ʑɯ́R | ɡó-zeN/	XP	CS_P
senchi (センチ; 'centimetre')	/séNcɕi/	1; 11: /(ʑɯR) iQ-séNcɕi/; 2; 3; 5; 12; 13; 15: SJ; 4; 14: (jū) yon; 6; 16: /(ʑɯR) ɾokɯ̥-séNcɕi/; 7; 17: (jū) {nana;shichi}; 8; 18: /(ʑɯR) haQ-séNcɕi/; 9; 19: (jū) kyū; 10; 20: /(ni-){ʑiQ;ʑɯQ}-séNcɕi/; nan; iku: /ikɯ̥-séNcɕi/	+1	CSL_+1
senchimētoru (センチメートル; 'centimetre')	/seNcɕiméRtoɾɯ/	1; 11: /(ʑɯR) iQ-seNcɕiméRtoɾɯ/; 2; 3; 5; 12; 13; 15: SJ; 4; 14: (jū) yon; 6; 16: /(ʑɯR) ɾokɯ̥-seNcɕiméRtoɾɯ/; 7; 17: (jū) {nana;shichi}; 8; 18: /(ʑɯR) haQ-seNcɕiméRtoɾɯ/; 9; 19: (jū) kyū; 10; 20: /(ni-){ʑiQ;ʑɯQ}-seNcɕiméRtoɾɯ/; nan; iku: /ikɯ̥-seNcɕiméRtoɾɯ/	−4	CL_M
sento (セント; 'cent')	/séNto/	1; 11: /(ʑɯR) iQ-séNto/; 2; 3; 5; 12; 13; 15: SJ; 4; 14: (jū) yon; 6; 16: /(ʑɯR) ɾokɯ̥-séNto/; 7; 17: (jū) nana; 8; 18: /(ʑɯR) haQ-séNto/; 9; 19: (jū) kyū; 10; 20: /(ni-){ʑiQ;ʑɯQ}-séNto/; nan	+1	CSL_+1
sō (層; 'storey')	/sóR/	1; 11: /(ʑɯR) {iQ;íQ}-soR/; 2; 3; 5; 12; 13: SJ; 4; 14: (jū) yon; 6; 16: /(ʑɯR) {ɾokɯ̥;ɾokɯ̥́}-soR/; 7; 17: (jū) nana; 8; 18: /(ʑɯR) {haQ;háQ}-soR/; 9; 19: (jū) kyū; 10; 20: /(ni-){ʑiQ;ʑɯQ;ʑíQ;ʑɯ́Q}-soR/; nan	D ~ P	CSL_D* ~ CS_P* (Note: Excluding kusō which is rare.)
sō (層; 'storey')	/sóR/	9: /kɯ̥-soR/	D	CSL_D* ~ CS_P*
sō (層; 'storey')	/sóR/	15: /ʑɯR ɡo-soR ~ ʑɯ́R (|) ɡo-soR ~ ʑɯ́R | ɡó-soR/	D ~ XD ~ XP	CSL_D* ~ CS_P*
sō (艘; 'small ship')		1; 11: /(ʑɯR) íQ-soR/; 2; 3; 12; 13: SJ; 4; 14: (jū) yon; 7; 17: (jū) nana; 8; 18: /(ʑɯR) háQ-soR/; 9; 19: (jū) kyū; 10; 20: /(ni-){ʑíQ;ʑɯ́Q}-soR/; 16: /ʑɯR ɾokɯ̥́-soR/; nan	P	CS_P* ~ CS_P_DX0*
sō (艘; 'small ship')		5: SJ	P ~ D	CS_P* ~ CS_P_DX0*
sō (艘; 'small ship')		6: /ɾokɯ̥́-soR → ɾokɯ̥-sóR/	P → +1	CS_P* ~ CS_P_DX0*
sō (艘; 'small ship')		15: /ʑɯ́R (|) ɡo-soR ~ ʑɯ́R | ɡó-soR/	XP ~ XD	CS_P* ~ CS_P_DX0*
soku (足; 'pair of footwear')		1: /iQ-sokɯ́/	−1	CS_P_−1SJQK*
soku (足; 'pair of footwear')		2; 5; 12: SJ; 3; 13: /(ʑɯR) sáN-sokɯ → (ʑɯR) sáN-zokɯ/; 4; 14: (jū) yon; 7; 17: (jū) nana; 9; 19: (jū) kyū; 20: /ni-{ʑíQ;ʑɯ́Q}-sokɯ/; nan: /náN-sokɯ → náN-zokɯ/	P	CS_P_−1SJQK*
soku (足; 'pair of footwear')		11: /ʑɯR {iQ-sokɯ́;íQ-sokɯ}/; 6; 16: /(ʑɯR) {ɾokɯ̥-sokɯ́;ɾokɯ̥́-sokɯ}/; 8; 18: /(ʑɯR) {haQ-sokɯ́;háQ-sokɯ}/; 10: /{ʑiQ;ʑɯQ}-sokɯ́ ~ ʑíQ;ʑɯ́Q-sokɯ/	−1 ~ P	CS_P_−1SJQK*
soku (足; 'pair of footwear')		15: /ʑɯ́R ɡo-sokɯ ~ ʑɯ́R | ɡó-sokɯ/	XP	CS_P_−1SJQK*
soroi (揃い; 'set ~ suite')	/soɾoi ~ {soɾoí → soɾói}/	1; 2: N	P	CSL_+1
soroi (揃い; 'set ~ suite')	/soɾoi ~ {soɾoí → soɾói}/	3; 6; 7: N; 4: yo; 5: /itsɯ̥-sóɾoi/; 8: /hacɕi̥-sóɾoi/; 9: kyū; 10: /{ʑiQ;ʑɯQ}-sóɾoi/	+1	CSL_+1
dāsu (ダース; 'dozen')	/dáRsɯ/	1; 2; 3; 5; 6; 8; 10; 11; 12; 13; 15; 16; 18; 20: SJ; 4; 14: (jū) yon; 7; 17: (jū) nana; 9; 19: (jū) kyū; nan	+1	CSL_+1
tai (体; 'corpse ~ divine statue')	/tái/	1; 11: /(ʑɯR) íQ-tai/; 2; 3; 5; 12; 13: SJ; 4; 14: (jū) yon; 6; 16: /(ʑɯR) ɾokɯ̥́-tai/; 7; 17: (jū) nana; 8; 18: /(ʑɯR) hacɕí̥-tai → (ʑɯR) háQ-tai/; 9; 19: (jū) kyū; 10; 20; 30; 40; 50; 60; 70; 80; 90: /({ni;saN;joN;ɡo;ɾokɯ;nana;hacɕi;kjɯR}-){ʑíQ;ʑɯ́Q}-tai/; 100: /hjakɯ̥́-tai/; 1,000: sen; nan	P	CS_P
tai (体; 'corpse ~ divine statue')	/tái/	15: /ʑɯ́R ɡo-tai ~ ʑɯ́R | ɡó-tai/	XP	CS_P
tai (体; 'corpse ~ divine statue')	/tái/	10,000: SJ	D	CS_P
dai (代; 'generation')	/dái/	1; 2; 3; 6; 8; 10; 11; 12; 13; 16; 18; 20; 30; 50; 60; 80; 90; 100: SJ; 4; 14: (jū) yon; 7; 17: (jū) {nana;shichi}; 9; 19: (jū) kyū; 40: NSJ ~ SJ; 70: NSJ; 1,000: sen; nan	P	CS_P_DX0*
dai (代; 'generation')	/dái/	4: yo; 9: ku; 10,000: SJ	D	CS_P_DX0*
dai (代; 'generation')	/dái/	5: SJ	D ~ P	CS_P_DX0*
dai (代; 'generation')	/dái/	14; 19: /ʑɯ́R (|) {jo;kɯ}-dai/	XD	CS_P_DX0*
dai (代; 'generation')	/dái/	15: /ʑɯ́R (|) ɡo-dai ~ ʑɯ́R | ɡó-dai/	XD ~ XP	CS_P_DX0*
daime (代目; 'ordinal generation ~ ordinal title holder')		1st; (Note: Alternatively; shodai (初代; /ɕódai ~ ɕodai/ 'the first generation').) 2nd; 3rd; 5th; 6th; 8th; 9th; 10th; 11th; 12th; 13th; 15th; 16th; 18th; 19th; 20th: SJ; 4th; 14th: (jū) yo(n); 7th; 17th: (jū) {nana;shichi}; nan	−1 ~ D	CSL_−1* ~ CSL_D*
dai (台; 'vehicle ~ machine ~ appliance')	/dái/	1; 2; 3; 6; 8; 10; 11; 12; 13; 16; 18; 20; 30; 50; 60; 80; 90; 100: SJ; 4; 14: (jū) yon; 7; 17: (jū) {nana;shichi}; 9; 19: (jū) kyū; 40: NSJ ~ SJ; 70: NSJ; 1,000: sen; nan	P	CS_P_DX0
dai (台; 'vehicle ~ machine ~ appliance')	/dái/	4: yo; 5; 10,000: SJ; 9: ku	D	CS_P_DX0
dai (台; 'vehicle ~ machine ~ appliance')	/dái/	14; 15; 19: /ʑɯ́R (|) {jo;ɡo;kɯ}-dai/	XD	CS_P_DX0
dai (題; 'exam question')	/dái/	1; 2; 3; 6; 8; 10; 11; 12; 13; 16; 18; 20; 30; 50; 60; 80; 90; 100: SJ; 4; 14: (jū) yon; 7; 17: (jū) {nana;shichi}; 9; 19: (jū) kyū; 40; 70: NSJ; 1,000: sen; nan	P	CS_P_DX0
dai (題; 'exam question')	/dái/	5; 10,000: SJ	D	CS_P_DX0
dai (題; 'exam question')	/dái/	15: /ʑɯ́R (|) ɡo-dai/	XD	CS_P_DX0
daseki (打席; 'at-bat')	/daseki/	1; 2; 3; 5; 6; 8; 10; 11; 12; 13; 15; 16; 18; 20: SJ; 4; 14: (jū) yon; 7; 17: (jū) nana; 9; 19: (jū) kyū; nan	+1	CSL_+1
taba (束; 'bundle')	/tába/	1; 2; 4; nan: N; 3: SJ ~ N; 5: /{ɡó;itsɯ̥́}-taba/; 6; 16: /(ʑɯR) ɾokɯ̥́-taba/; 7; 17: (jū) nana; 8; 18: /(ʑɯR) hacɕí̥-taba/; 9; 19: (jū) kyū; 10: /{ʑíQ;ʑɯ́Q;tó}-taba/; 11: /ʑɯR icɕí̥-taba/; 12; 13: SJ; 14: jū yon; 20: /ni-{ʑíQ;ʑɯ́Q}-taba/	P	CS_P
taba (束; 'bundle')	/tába/	15: /ʑɯ́R ɡo-taba ~ ʑɯ́R | ɡó-taba/	XP	CS_P
tabi (度; 'occurrence')	/tabí/	1; 2; 3; 6; 7; 8: N; 4: yo; 5: /{itsɯ̥́;ɡó}-tabi/; 9: SJ; 10: /{ʑíQ;ʑɯ́Q;tó}-tabi/	P	CS_P
tama (玉; 'ball ~ vegetable head ~ serving of noodles')	/tamá/	1; 2; 4; nan: N; 3: SJ ~ N; 5; 12; 13: SJ; 6; 16: /(ʑɯR) ɾokɯ̥́-tama/; 7; 17: (jū) nana; 8; 18: /(ʑɯR) hacɕí̥-tama → (ʑɯR) háQ-tama/; 9; 19: (jū) kyū; 10; 20: /(ni-){ʑíQ;ʑɯ́Q}-tama/; 11: /ʑɯR icɕí̥-tama/; 14: jū yon	P	CS_P
tama (玉; 'ball ~ vegetable head ~ serving of noodles')	/tamá/	15: /ʑɯ́R ɡo-tama ~ ʑɯ́R | ɡó-tama/	XP	CS_P
dan (段; 'tier ~ column of text ~ paragraph ~ theatrical act')	/dáN/	1; 2; 6; 8; 10; 11; 12; 13; 16; 18; 20: SJ; 4; 14: (jū) yon; 7; 17: (jū) {nana;shichi}; 9; 19: (jū) kyū; nan	P	CS_P_DX0* ~ CS_P_D0X0*
dan (段; 'tier ~ column of text ~ paragraph ~ theatrical act')	/dáN/	3: SJ	P ~ D	CS_P_DX0* ~ CS_P_D0X0*
dan (段; 'tier ~ column of text ~ paragraph ~ theatrical act')	/dáN/	4: yo; 5: SJ; 9: ku	D	CS_P_DX0* ~ CS_P_D0X0*
dan (段; 'tier ~ column of text ~ paragraph ~ theatrical act')	/dáN/	14; 15; 19: /ʑɯ́R (|) {jo;ɡo;kɯ}-daN/	XD	CS_P_DX0* ~ CS_P_D0X0*
dan (段) (Note: The lowest rank is shodan (初段; /ɕodaN/).)	/dáN/	2nd; 6th; 7th; 8th; 10th: SJ	P	CS_P_D0X0
dan (段)	/dáN/	3rd; 5th: SJ; 4th: yo; 9th: ku	D	CS_P_D0X0
dan (段)	/dáN/	nan	D ~ P	CS_P_D0X0
danshiki (段式; 'phase ~ stage') (Note: Attributively, for example in sandanshiki roketto (三段式ロケット; 'a three-stage rocket').)		1; 2; 3; 5; 6; 8; 10; 11; 12; 13; 15; 16; 18; 20: SJ; 4; 14: (jū) yo(n); 7; 17: (jū) nana; 9; 19: (jū) kyū; nan	D	CSL_D
dankai (段階; 'phase ~ stage')	/daNkai/	1; 2; 3; 5; 6; 8; 10; 11; 12; 13; 15; 16; 18; 20: SJ; 4; 14: (jū) yon; 7; 17: (jū) nana; 9; 19: (jū) kyū; nan	+1	CSL_+1
tan'i (単位; 'unit')	/táNi/	1: /icɕi̥-táNi → iQ-táNi/; 2; 3; 5: SJ; 4: yon; 6: /ɾokɯ̥-táNi/; 7: N ~ SJ; 8: /hacɕi̥-táNi → haQ-táNi/; 9: kyū; 10: /{ʑiQ;ʑɯQ}-táNi/; nan; iku: /ikɯ̥-táNi/	+1	CSL_+1
chīmu (チーム; 'team')	/cɕíRmɯ/	1: /{icɕi̥-cɕíRmɯ → iQ-cɕíRmɯ} ~ hi̥to-cɕíRmɯ/; 2: SJ ~ N; 3; 5; 12; 13; 15: SJ; 4; 14: (jū) yon; 6; 16: /(ʑɯR) ɾokɯ̥-cɕíRmɯ/; 7; 17: (jū) nana; 8; 18: /(ʑɯR) hacɕi̥-cɕíRmɯ → (ʑɯR) haQ-cɕíRmɯ/; 9; 19: (jū) kyū; 10; 20: /(ni-){ʑiQ;ʑɯQ}-cɕíRmɯ/; 11: /ʑɯR icɕi̥-cɕíRmɯ → ʑɯR iQ-cɕíRmɯ/; nan	+1	CSL_+1
chiku (地区; 'region ~ zone')	/cɕí̥kɯ → cɕi̥kɯ́/	1; 11: /{(ʑɯR) icɕi-cɕí̥kɯ → (ʑɯR) iQ-cɕí̥kɯ} ~ (ʑɯR) icɕi̥-cɕíkɯ/; 2; 3; 5; 12; 13; 15: SJ; 4; 14: (jū) yon; 6; 16: /(ʑɯR) {ɾokɯ-cɕí̥kɯ;ɾokɯ̥-cɕíkɯ}/; 7; 17: (jū) nana; 8; 18: /{(ʑɯR) hacɕi-cɕí̥kɯ → (ʑɯR) haQ-cɕí̥kɯ} ~ (ʑɯR) hacɕi̥-cɕíkɯ/; 9; 19: (jū) kyū; 10; 20: /(ni-){ʑiQ;ʑɯQ}-cɕí̥kɯ/; nan	+1	CSL_+1
chiten (地点; 'locational point/spot')	/{cɕí̥teN → cɕi̥téN} ~ cɕi̥teN/	1; 11: /{(ʑɯR) icɕi-cɕí̥teN → (ʑɯR) iQ-cɕí̥teN} ~ (ʑɯR) icɕi̥-cɕíteN/; 2; 3; 5; 12; 13; 15: SJ; 4; 14: (jū) yon; 6; 16: /(ʑɯR) {ɾokɯ-cɕí̥teN;ɾokɯ̥-cɕíteN}/; 7; 17: (jū) nana; 8; 18: /{(ʑɯR) hacɕi-cɕí̥teN → (ʑɯR) haQ-cɕí̥teN} ~ (ʑɯR) {hacɕi̥-cɕíteN/; 9; 19: (jū) kyū; 10; 20: /(ni-){ʑiQ;ʑɯQ}-cɕí̥teN/; nan	+1	CSL_+1
chaku (着; 'ordinal arrival ~ ordinal finishing place')	/cɕákɯ/	1st; 11th: /(ʑɯR) iQ-cɕakɯ́/; 7th; 17th: SJ	−1	CSL_−1* ~ CS_P_−1SJQK*
chaku (着; 'ordinal arrival ~ ordinal finishing place')	/cɕákɯ/	2nd; 3rd; 5th; 12th; 13th: SJ; 4th; 14th: (jū) yon; 6th; 16th: /(ʑɯR) {ɾokɯ̥-cɕakɯ́;ɾokɯ̥́-cɕakɯ}/; 7th; 17th: (jū) nana; 8th; 18th: /(ʑɯR) {haQ-cɕakɯ́;háQ-cɕakɯ}/; 9th; 19th: (jū) kyū; 10th; 20th; 30th; 40th; 50th; 60th; 80th; 90th: /{ni;saN;joN;ɡo;ɾokɯ;nana;hacɕi;kjɯR}-{{ʑiQ;ʑɯQ}-cɕakɯ́;{ʑíQ;ʑɯ́Q}-cɕakɯ}/; nan	−1 ~ P	CSL_−1* ~ CS_P_−1SJQK*
chaku (着; 'ordinal arrival ~ ordinal finishing place')	/cɕákɯ/	15th: /ʑɯR ɡo-cɕakɯ́ ~ ʑɯ́R ɡo-cɕakɯ ~ ʑɯ́R | {ɡo-cɕakɯ́;ɡó-cɕakɯ}/	−1 ~ X−1 ~ XP	CSL_−1* ~ CS_P_−1SJQK*
chaku (着; 'ordinal arrival ~ ordinal finishing place')	/cɕákɯ/	iku: /ikɯ̥-cɕakɯ́ ~ íkɯ̥-cɕakɯ/	−1 ~ PP	CSL_−1* ~ CS_P_−1SJQK*
chaku (着; 'outfit')	/cɕákɯ/	1; 11: /(ʑɯR) iQ-cɕakɯ́/; 10: /{ʑiQ;ʑɯQ}-cɕakɯ́/	−1	CS_P_−1SJQK*
chaku (着; 'outfit')	/cɕákɯ/	2; 5: SJ; 6; 16: /(ʑɯR) {ɾokɯ̥-cɕakɯ́;ɾokɯ̥́-cɕakɯ}/; 8; 18: /(ʑɯR) {haQ-cɕakɯ́;háQ-cɕakɯ}/	P ~ −1	CS_P_−1SJQK*
chaku (着; 'outfit')	/cɕákɯ/	3; 12; 13: SJ; 4; 14: (jū) yon; 7; 17: (jū) nana; 9; 19: (jū) kyū; 20: /ni-{ʑíQ;ʑɯ́Q}-cɕakɯ/; nan	P	CS_P_−1SJQK*
chaku (着; 'outfit')	/cɕákɯ/	15: /ʑɯ́R ɡo-cɕakɯ ~ ʑɯ́R | ɡó-cɕakɯ/	XP	CS_P_−1SJQK*
chō (兆; 'short-scale trillion')	/cɕóR/	1; 11: /(ʑɯR) {íQ-cɕoR;iQ-cɕóR}/; 2; 3; 5; 12; 13: SJ; 4; 14: (jū) yon; 6; 16: /(ʑɯR) {ɾokɯ̥́-cɕoR;ɾokɯ̥-cɕóR}/; 7; 17: (jū) {nana;shichi}; 8; 18: /(ʑɯR) {háQ-cɕoR;haQ-cɕóR}/; 9; 19: (jū) kyū; 10; 20: /(ni-){{ʑíQ;ʑɯ́Q}-cɕoR;{ʑiQ;ʑɯQ}-cɕóR}/; nan	P ~ +1	CS_P* ~ CSL_+1* ~ CS_P_+1S!+1* ~ CS_P_+1S!+1!0* ~ CS_P_+1SJ*
chō (兆; 'short-scale trillion')	/cɕóR/	15: /ʑɯ́R ɡo-cɕoR ~ ʑɯ́R | {ɡó-cɕoR;ɡo-cɕóR}/	XP ~ X+1	CS_P* ~ CSL_+1* ~ CS_P_+1S!+1* ~ CS_P_+1S!+1!0* ~ CS_P_+1SJ*
chō (兆; 'short-scale trillion')	/cɕóR/	iku: /íkɯ̥-cɕoR ~ ikɯ̥-cɕóR/	PP ~ +1	CS_P* ~ CSL_+1* ~ CS_P_+1S!+1* ~ CS_P_+1S!+1!0* ~ CS_P_+1SJ*
chō (丁; 'Japanese-style book leaf ~ block of tofu ~ serving ~ match of a traditionally Japanese sport') chō (町)	/cɕóR/	1; 11: /(ʑɯR) íQ-cɕoR/; 2; 3; 12; 13: SJ; 4; 14: (jū) yon; 7; 17: (jū) nana; 8; 18: /(ʑɯR) háQ-cɕoR/; 9; 19: (jū) kyū; 10; 20: /(ni-){ʑíQ;ʑɯ́Q}-cɕoR/; 16: /ʑɯR ɾokɯ̥́-cɕoR/; nan	P	CS_P* ~ CS_P_DX0*
chō (丁; 'Japanese-style book leaf ~ block of tofu ~ serving ~ match of a traditionally Japanese sport') chō (町)	/cɕóR/	5: SJ	P ~ D	CS_P* ~ CS_P_DX0*
chō (丁; 'Japanese-style book leaf ~ block of tofu ~ serving ~ match of a traditionally Japanese sport') chō (町)	/cɕóR/	6: /ɾokɯ̥́-cɕoR → ɾokɯ̥-cɕóR/	P → +1	CS_P* ~ CS_P_DX0*
chō (丁; 'Japanese-style book leaf ~ block of tofu ~ serving ~ match of a traditionally Japanese sport') chō (町)	/cɕóR/	15: /ʑɯ́R (|) ɡo-cɕoR ~ ʑɯ́R | ɡó-cɕoR/	XP ~ XD	CS_P* ~ CS_P_DX0*
chōme (丁目)	/cɕoR-mé/	1st; 11th: /(ʑɯR) iQ-cɕoR-mé/; 2nd; 3rd; 5th; 12th; 13th; 15th: SJ; 4th; 14th: (jū) yon; 6th; 16th: /(ʑɯR) ɾokɯ̥-cɕoR-mé/; 7th; 17th: (jū) nana; 8th; 18th: /(ʑɯR) haQ-cɕoR-mé/; 9th; 19th: (jū) kyū; 10th; 20th: /(ni-){ʑiQ;ʑɯQ}-cɕoR-mé/; nan	−1	CSL_−1
tsui (対; 'pair of objects')	/tsɯi/	1: /iQ-tsɯi/	D	
tsui (対; 'pair of objects')	/tsɯi/	2; 3; 5; 12; 13: SJ; 4; 14: (jū) yon; 6; 16: /(ʑɯR) ɾokɯ̥́-tsɯi/; 7; 17: (jū) nana; 8; 18: /(ʑɯR) háQ-tsɯi/; 9; 19: (jū) kyū; 10; 20: /(ni-){ʑíQ;ʑɯ́Q}-tsɯi/; nan	P	
tsui (対; 'pair of objects')	/tsɯi/	11: /ʑɯR {iQ;íQ}-tsɯi/	D ~ P	
tsui (対; 'pair of objects')	/tsɯi/	15: /ʑɯ́R ɡo-tsɯi ~ ʑɯ́R | ɡó-tsɯi/	XP	
tsū (通; 'mail letter ~ document')	/tsɯ́R/	1; 11: /(ʑɯR) {iQ-tsɯ́R;íQ-tsɯR}/	+1 ~ P	CS_P*
tsū (通; 'mail letter ~ document')	/tsɯ́R/	2; 3; 5; 12; 13: SJ; 4; 14: (jū) yon; 6; 16: /(ʑɯR) ɾokɯ̥́-tsɯR/; 7; 17: (jū) nana; 8; 18: /(ʑɯR) háQ-tsɯR/; 9; 19: (jū) kyū; 10; 20; 30; 40; 50; 60; 70; 80; 90: /({ni;saN;joN;ɡo;ɾokɯ;nana;hacɕi;kjɯR}-){ʑíQ;ʑɯ́Q}-tsɯR/; 100: /hjakɯ̥́-tsɯR/; 1,000: sen; nan	P	CS_P*
tsū (通; 'mail letter ~ document')	/tsɯ́R/	15: /ʑɯ́R ɡo-tsɯR ~ ʑɯ́R | ɡó-tsɯR/	XP	CS_P*
tsū (通; 'mail letter ~ document')	/tsɯ́R/	10,000: SJ	D	CS_P*
tsuki (月; 'cardinal month')	/tsɯ̥kí/	1; 3; 5; 6; 7; 8; 9; nan: N; 4: yo; 10: to	P	CS_P*
tsuki (月; 'cardinal month')	/tsɯ̥kí/	2: N	P ~ −1	CS_P*
tsuki (月; 'cardinal month')	/tsɯ̥kí/	han	−1	CS_P*
tsuki (月; 'cardinal month')	/tsɯ̥kí/	iku	PP ~ P	CS_P*
tsubu (粒; 'granule ~ drop(let)')	/tsɯ́bɯ/	1; 2; 4; nan: N; 3: SJ ~ N; 5: /{ɡó;itsɯ̥́}-tsɯbɯ/; 6; 16: /(ʑɯR) ɾokɯ̥́-tsɯbɯ/; 7; 17: (jū) nana; 8; 18: /(ʑɯR) hacɕí̥-tsɯbɯ → (ʑɯR) háQ-tsɯbɯ/; 9; 19: (jū) kyū; 10: /{ʑíQ;ʑɯ́Q;tó}-tsɯbɯ/; 11: /ʑɯR icɕí̥-tsɯbɯ → ʑɯR íQ-tsɯbɯ/; 12; 13: SJ; 14: jū yon; 20: /ni-{ʑíQ;ʑɯ́Q}-tsɯbɯ/	P	CS_P
tsubu (粒; 'granule ~ drop(let)')	/tsɯ́bɯ/	15: /ʑɯ́R ɡo-tsɯbɯ ~ ʑɯ́R | ɡó-tsɯbɯ/	XP	CS_P
tsubo (坪)	/tsɯbo/	1; 2; 4; nan: N; 3: SJ ~ N; 5; 12; 13: SJ; 6; 16: /(ʑɯR) ɾokɯ̥́-tsɯbo/; 7; 17: (jū) nana; 8; 18: /(ʑɯR) hacɕí̥-tsɯbo → (ʑɯR) háQ-tsɯbo/; 9; 19: (jū) kyū; 10: /{ʑíQ;ʑɯ́Q;tó}-tsɯbo/; 11: /ʑɯR icɕí̥-tsɯbo → ʑɯR íQ-tsɯbo/; 14: jū yon; 20: /ni-{ʑíQ;ʑɯ́Q}-tsɯbo/	P	CS_P
tsubo (坪)	/tsɯbo/	15: /ʑɯ́R ɡo-tsɯbo ~ ʑɯ́R | ɡó-tsɯbo/	XP	CS_P
dīkē (DK; 'dining kitchen')	/diRkéR/	1: SJ ~ E; 2: SJ ~ nī; 3; 5; 6; 8; 10: SJ; 4: yon; 7; nan: N; 9: kyū	−2	CL_M
teki (滴; 'drop(let)')		1; 11: /(ʑɯR) iQ-tekí/; 10: /{ʑiQ;ʑɯQ}-tekí/	−1	CS_P_−1SJQK*
teki (滴; 'drop(let)')		2; 3; 5; 12; 13: SJ; 4; 14: (jū) yon; 7; 17: (jū) nana; 9; 19: (jū) kyū; 20: /ni-{ʑíQ;ʑɯ́Q}-teki/; nan	P	CS_P_−1SJQK*
teki (滴; 'drop(let)')		6; 16: /(ʑɯR) {ɾokɯ̥-tekí;ɾokɯ̥́-teki}/; 8; 18: /(ʑɯR) {haQ-tekí;háQ-teki}/	−1 ~ P	CS_P_−1SJQK*
teki (滴; 'drop(let)')		15: /ʑɯ́R ɡo-teki ~ ʑɯ́R | ɡó-teki/	XP	CS_P_−1SJQK*
deshiberu (デシベル; 'decibel')	/déɕibeɾɯ ~ deɕíbeɾɯ/	1; 2; 3; 5; 6; 8; 10; 11; 12; 13; 15; 16; 18; 20: SJ; 4; 14: (jū) yon; 7; 17: (jū) nana; 9; 19: (jū) kyū; nan	+1	CSL_+1
ten (店; 'shop')		1; 11: /(ʑɯR) íQ-teN/; 2; 3; 5; 12; 13: SJ; 4; 14: (jū) yon; 6; 16: /(ʑɯR) ɾokɯ̥́-teN/; 7; 17: (jū) nana; 8; 18: /(ʑɯR) hacɕí̥-teN → (ʑɯR) háQ-teN/; 9; 19: (jū) kyū; 10; 20: /(ni-){ʑíQ;ʑɯ́Q}-teN/; nan	P	CS_P
ten (店; 'shop')		15: /ʑɯ́R ɡo-teN ~ ʑɯ́R | ɡó-teN/	XP	CS_P
tenpo (店舗; 'shop')	/téNpo/	1; 11: /(ʑɯR) icɕi̥-téNpo → (ʑɯR) iQ-téNpo/; 2; 3; 5; 12; 13; 15: SJ; 4; 14: (jū) yon; 6; 16: /(ʑɯR) ɾokɯ̥-téNpo/; 7; 17: (jū) nana; 8; 18: /(ʑɯR) hacɕi̥-téNpo → (ʑɯR) haQ-téNpo/; 9; 19: (jū) kyū; 10; 20: /(ni-){ʑiQ;ʑɯQ}-téNpo/; nan	+1	CSL_+1
ten (点; 'item')	/teN/	1; 11: /(ʑɯR) íQ-teN/; 2; 3; 5; 12; 13: SJ; 4; 14: (jū) yon; 6; 16: /(ʑɯR) ɾokɯ̥́-teN/; 7; 17: (jū) nana; 8; 18: /(ʑɯR) hacɕí̥-teN → (ʑɯR) háQ-teN/; 9; 19: (jū) kyū; 10; 20; 30; 40; 50; 60; 70; 80; 90: /({ni;saN;joN;ɡo;ɾokɯ;nana;hacɕi;kjɯR}-){ʑíQ;ʑɯ́Q}-teN/; 100: /hjakɯ̥́-teN/; 1,000: sen; nan	P	CS_P
ten (点; 'item')	/teN/	15: /ʑɯ́R ɡo-teN ~ ʑɯ́R | ɡó-teN/	XP	CS_P
ten (点; 'item')	/teN/	10,000: SJ	D	CS_P
ten (点; 'numerical point')	/teN/	0; (Note: /ɾei-téN ~ ɾei-teN/ means 'zero points' (no points); and is not to be confused with /ɾéi-teN/; which means a 'zero point' or 'point zero' (the point at which something has a value of zero).) 1: SJ	+1 ~ D	CS_P_+1SJ*
ten (点; 'numerical point')	/teN/	2; 3; 5; 12; 13: SJ; 6; 16: /(ʑɯR) ɾokɯ̥-téN/; 8; 18: /(ʑɯR) hacɕi̥-téN → (ʑɯR) haQ-téN/; 10: /{ʑiQ;ʑɯQ}-téN/; 11: /ʑɯR iQ-téN/; 100: /hjakɯ̥-téN/	+1	CS_P_+1SJ*
ten (点; 'numerical point')	/teN/	4; 14: (jū) yon; 7; 17: (jū) nana; 9; 19: (jū) kyū; 1,000: sen; nan	+1 ~ P	CS_P_+1SJ*
ten (点; 'numerical point')	/teN/	15: /ʑɯ́R ɡo-teN ~ ʑɯ́R | ɡo-téN/	X+1	CS_P_+1SJ*
ten (点; 'numerical point')	/teN/	20; 30; 40; 50; 60; 70; 80; 90: /{ni;saN;joN;ɡo;ɾokɯ;nana;hacɕi;kjɯR}-{ʑíQ;ʑɯ́Q}-teN/	P	CS_P_+1SJ*
ten (点; 'numerical point')	/teN/	10,000: SJ	D	CS_P_+1SJ*
do (度; 'degree')	/do/	0; 1; 2; 3; 5; 6; 8; 9; 10; 11; 12; 13; 16; 50; 60; 80; 100: SJ; 4; 14: (jū) yon; 7; 17: (jū) {nana;shichi}; 19: jū kyū; 70: NSJ; 1,000: sen; nan	P	CS_P
do (度; 'degree')	/do/	15; 19: /ʑɯ́R {ɡo;kɯ}-do ~ ʑɯ́R | {ɡó;kɯ́}-do/	XP	CS_P
do (度; 'degree')	/do/	20; 30; 90: SJ; 40: NSJ	P ~ R	CS_P
do (度; 'degree')	/do/	10,000: SJ	D	CS_P
do (度; 'occurrence')	/do/	1; 2; 11; 12: SJ; 4: yo	−1	
do (度; 'occurrence')	/do/	3; 8; 9; 10; 13; 16; 18; 40; 50; 60; 80; 100: SJ; 4; 14: (jū) yon; 7; 17: (jū) {nana;shichi}; 19: jū kyū; 70: NSJ; 1,000: sen; nan	P	
do (度; 'occurrence')	/do/	5; 6: SJ	−1 ~ P	
do (度; 'occurrence')	/do/	15; 19: /ʑɯ́R {ɡo;kɯ}-do ~ ʑɯ́R | {ɡó;kɯ́}-do/; 24; 25; 26; 34; 35; 36; 44; 45; 46; 74; 75; 76; 94; 95; 96: /{ní;sáN;jóN;naná;kjɯ́R}-ʑɯR {joN;ɡo;ɾokɯ}-do ~ {ní;sáN;jóN;naná;kjɯ́R}-ʑɯR | {jóN;ɡó;ɾokɯ́}-do/; 54; 55; 56; 64; 65; 66; 84; 85; 86: /{ɡo;ɾokɯ;hacɕi}-ʑɯR (|) {jóN;ɡó;ɾokɯ́}-do/	XP	
do (度; 'occurrence')	/do/	20; 30; 90: SJ; 40: NSJ	P ~ R	
do (度; 'occurrence')	/do/	10,000: SJ	D	
dome (度目; 'ordinal occurrence')		1st; 2nd; 3rd; 5th; 6th; 8th; 9th; 10th; 11th; 12th; 13th; 15th; 16th; 18th; 20th: SJ; 4th: N; 7th; 17th: (jū) {nana;shichi}; 14th; 19th: jū {yon;kyū}; nan	−1	CSL_−1
tō (棟; 'building')	/tóR/	1; 11: /(ʑɯR) íQ-toR/; 2; 3; 5; 12; 13: SJ; 4; 14: (jū) yon; 6; 16: /(ʑɯR) ɾokɯ̥́-toR/; 7; 17: (jū) nana; 8; 18: /(ʑɯR) hacɕí̥-toR → háQ-toR/; 9; 19: (jū) kyū; 10; 20; 30; 40; 50; 60; 70; 80; 90: /({ni;saN;joN;ɡo;ɾokɯ;nana;hacɕi;kjɯR}-){ʑíQ;ʑɯ́Q}-toR/; 100: /hjakɯ̥́-toR/; 1,000: sen; nan	P	CS_P
tō (棟; 'building')	/tóR/	15: /ʑɯ́R ɡo-toR ~ ʑɯ́R | ɡó-toR/	XP	CS_P
tō (棟; 'building')	/tóR/	10,000: SJ	D	CS_P
tō (頭; 'large animal ~ traditionally Japanese hat ~ traditionally Japanese mask')		1; 11: /(ʑɯR) íQ-toR/; 2; 3; 5; 12; 13: SJ; 4; 14: (jū) yon; 6; 16: /(ʑɯR) ɾokɯ̥́-toR/; 7; 17: (jū) nana; 8; 18: /(ʑɯR) hacɕí̥-toR → háQ-toR/; 9; 19: (jū) kyū; 10; 20; 30; 40; 50; 60; 70; 80; 90: /({ni;saN;joN;ɡo;ɾokɯ;nana;hacɕi;kjɯR}-){ʑíQ;ʑɯ́Q}-toR/; 100: /hjakɯ̥́-toR/; 1,000: sen; nan	P	CS_P
tō (頭; 'large animal ~ traditionally Japanese hat ~ traditionally Japanese mask')		15: /ʑɯ́R ɡo-toR ~ ʑɯ́R | ɡó-toR/	XP	CS_P
tō (頭; 'large animal ~ traditionally Japanese hat ~ traditionally Japanese mask')		10,000: SJ	D	CS_P
tō (等; 'rank ~ class ~ grade')	/tóR/	1; 11: /(ʑɯR) iQ-{tóR;toR}/; 2; 3; 5; 12; 13: SJ; 4; 14: (jū) yon; 6; 16: /(ʑɯR) ɾokɯ̥-{tóR;toR}/; 7; 17: (jū) {nana;shichi}; 8; 18: /{(ʑɯR) hacɕi̥-tóR → (ʑɯR) haQ-tóR} ~ {(ʑɯR) hacɕi̥-toR → (ʑɯR) haQ-toR}/; 9; 19: (jū) kyū; 10; 20: /(ni-){ʑiQ;ʑɯQ}-{tóR;toR}/; nan	+1 ~ D	CSL_+1* ~ CSL_D*
tō (等; 'rank ~ class ~ grade')	/tóR/	15: /{ʑɯ́R;ʑɯR} ɡo-toR ~ ʑɯ́R | ɡo-tóR/	X+1 ~ D	CSL_+1* ~ CSL_D*
tōri (通り; 'method ~ set of items')	/toRɾí/	1; 4; nan: N; 2; 3: N ~ SJ; 5; 12; 13; 15: SJ; 6; 16: /(ʑɯR) ɾokɯ̥-toRɾi/; 7; 17: (jū) nana; 8; 18: /(ʑɯR) hacɕi̥-toRɾi → (ʑɯR) haQ-toRɾi/; 9; 19: (jū) kyū; 10; 20: /(ni-){ʑiQ;ʑɯQ}-toRɾi/; 11: /ʑɯR icɕi̥-toRɾi/; 14: jū yon	D	CSL_D
doru (ドル; 'dollar')	/dóɾɯ/	1; 2; 3; 5; 6; 8; 10; 11; 12; 13; 16; 18; 50; 60; 80; 100; 200; 500; 600; 800: SJ; 4; 14: (jū) yon; 7; 17: (jū) nana; 9; 19: (jū) kyū; 70; 700: NSJ; 1,000: sen; nan	P	CS_P
doru (ドル; 'dollar')	/dóɾɯ/	15: /ʑɯ́R ɡo-doɾɯ ~ ʑɯ́R | ɡó-doɾɯ/	XP	CS_P
doru (ドル; 'dollar')	/dóɾɯ/	20; 30; 90; 300; 900: SJ; 40; 400: NSJ	P ~ R	CS_P
doru (ドル; 'dollar')	/dóɾɯ/	1,000: issen; 2,000; 3,000; 5,000; 6,000; 8,000; 9,000; 10,000; 1,000,000: SJ; 4,000; 7,000: NSJ	D	CS_P
ton (トン; 'ton(ne)')	/tóN/	1; 11: /(ʑɯR) íQ-toN/; 2; 3; 5; 12; 13: SJ; 4; 14: (jū) yon; 6; 16: /(ʑɯR) ɾokɯ̥́-toN/; 7; 17: (jū) nana; 8; 18: /(ʑɯR) hacɕí̥-toN → (ʑɯR) háQ-toN/; 9; 19: (jū) kyū; 10; 20; 30; 40; 50; 60; 70; 80; 90: /({ni;saN;joN;ɡo;ɾokɯ;nana;hacɕi;kjɯR}-){ʑíQ;ʑɯ́Q}-toN/; 100: /hjakɯ̥́-toN/; 1,000: sen; nan	P	CS_P
ton (トン; 'ton(ne)')	/tóN/	15: /ʑɯ́R ɡo-toN ~ ʑɯ́R | ɡó-toN/	XP	CS_P
ton (トン; 'ton(ne)')	/tóN/	10,000: SJ	D	CS_P
nan (男; 'ordinal son') (Note: The eldest son is chōnan (長男; /cɕóRnaN ~ cɕoRnáN/).)		2nd: ji	P	CSL_+1* ~ CS_P*
nan (男; 'ordinal son')		3rd; 5th; 6th; 7th; 8th; 10th: SJ; 4th: yon; 9th: kyū	+1 ~ P	CSL_+1* ~ CS_P*
nan (男; 'cardinal son')		1; 2; 3; 5; 6; 7; 8; 10: SJ; 4: yon; 9: kyū	P	CS_P
nen (年; 'year')	/néN/	1; (Note: "One year" or "1 (B)CE." The first year of a named era or calendar is gannen (元年; /ɡáNneN/ lit. 'original year'); as in Nintoku Tennō gannen (仁徳天皇元年; '313; the first year of Emperor Nintoku's reign'); Heisei gannen (平成元年; 'Heisei 1'); Kigen gannen (紀元元年; '1 CE'); mai kā gannen (マイカー元年; lit. 'my-car 1' '1966; the first year of consumer cars in Japan'); fukushi gannen (福祉元年; '1990; the first year of Japan's welfare system'); dejitaru hōsō gannen (デジタル放送元年; 'the first year of digital broadcasting'); Isuramureki gannen (イスラム暦元年; 'the first year of the Islamic calendar'); etc.) 2; 6; 8; 10; 11; 12; 13; 16; 18; 40; 50; 60; 70; 80; 100; 200; 500; 600; 800: SJ; 7; 17: (jū) {shichi;nana}; 9; 19: (jū) kyū; 14: jū yon; nan	P	CS_P_D0X0*
nen (年; 'year')	/néN/	3; 5; 2,000; 3,000; 5,000; 6,000; 8,000; 9,000; 10,000: SJ; 4: yo; 9: ku; 4,000; 7,000: NSJ	D	CS_P_D0X0*
nen (年; 'year')	/néN/	14; 19: /ʑɯ́R (|) {jo;kɯ}-neN/; 24; 25; 34; 35; 44; 45; 74; 75; 94; 95: /{ní;sáN;jóN;naná;kjɯ́R}-ʑɯR (|) {jo;ɡo}-neN/; 54; 55; 64; 65; 84; 85: /{ɡo;ɾokɯ;hacɕi}-ʑɯR (|) {jo;ɡo}-neN/	XD	CS_P_D0X0*
nen (年; 'year')	/néN/	15: /ʑɯ́R (|) ɡo-neN ~ ʑɯR ɡó-neN/	XD ~ P	CS_P_D0X0*
nen (年; 'year')	/néN/	20; 30; 90; 300; 900: SJ; 40; 70; 400; 700: NSJ	P ~ R	CS_P_D0X0*
nen (年; 'year')	/néN/	23; 33; 43; 73; 93: /{ní;sáN;jóN;naná;kjɯ́R}-ʑɯR (|) saN-neN ~ {ní;sáN;jóN;naná;kjɯ́R}-ʑɯR | sáN-neN/; 53; 63; 83: /{ɡo;ɾokɯ;hacɕi}-ʑɯR (|) {saN;sáN}-neN/	XD ~ XP	CS_P_D0X0*
nen (年; 'year')	/néN/	1,000: sen; han	P ~ D	CS_P_D0X0*
nen (年; 'year')	/néN/	iku: /íkɯ-neN/	PP	CS_P_D0X0*
nensei (年生; 'ordinal year's student')		1st; 2nd; (Note: /icɕi-néN-sei; ni-néN-sei/ mean 'first-year student; second-year student'; and are not to be confused with /icɕi-neN-sei; ni-neN-sei/ which mean 'annual plant; biennial plant'.) 3rd; 5th; 6th; 7th; 8th; 10th; 11th; 12th; 13th; 15th; 16th; 17th; 18th; 20th: SJ; 4th; 14th: (jū) yo; 9th; 19th: (jū) kyū; nan	+1	CSL_+1
notto (ノット; 'knot')	/nóQto/	1; 2; 3; 5; 6; 8; 10; 11; 12; 13; 15; 16; 18; 20: SJ; 4; 14: (jū) yon; 7; 17: (jū) nana; 9; 19: (jū) kyū; nan	+1	CSL_+1
ha (派; 'faction ~ sect ~ school of thought')	/há/	1; 11: /(ʑɯR) íQ-pa/; 2; 5; 8; 12; 18: SJ; 3; 13: /(ʑɯR) sáN-pa/; 4; 14: /(ʑɯR) jóN-ha → (ʑɯR) jóN-pa/; 6; 16: /(ʑɯR) ɾóQ-pa/; 7; 17: (jū) nana; 9; 19: (jū) kyū; 10; 20: /(ni-){ʑíQ;ʑɯ́Q}-pa/; nan: /náN-pa/	P	CS_P
ha (派; 'faction ~ sect ~ school of thought')	/há/	15: /ʑɯ́R ɡo-ha ~ ʑɯ́R | ɡó-ha/	XP	CS_P
ha (波; 'wave')		1; 11: /(ʑɯR) íQ-pa/; 2; 5; 8; 12; 18: SJ; 3; 13: /(ʑɯR) sáN-pa/; 4; 14: /(ʑɯR) jóN-ha → (ʑɯR) jóN-pa/; 6; 16: /(ʑɯR) ɾóQ-pa/; 7; 17: (jū) nana; 9; 19: (jū) kyū; 10; 20: /(ni-){ʑíQ;ʑɯ́Q}-pa/; nan: /náN-pa/	P	CS_P
ha (波; 'wave')		15: /ʑɯ́R ɡo-ha ~ ʑɯ́R | ɡó-ha/	XP	CS_P
pāsento (パーセント; 'per cent')	/paRséNto/	1; 11: /(ʑɯR) icɕi̥-paRséNto → (ʑɯR) iQ-paRséNto/; 2; 3; 5; 12; 13; 15: SJ; 4; 14: (jū) yon; 6; 16: /(ʑɯR) ɾokɯ̥-paRséNto → (ʑɯR) ɾoQ-paRséNto/; 7; 17: (jū) nana; 8; 18: /(ʑɯR) hacɕi̥-paRséNto/; 9; 17: (jū) kyū; 10; 20: /(ni-){ʑiQ;ʑɯQ}-paRséNto/; nan	−3	CL_M
hai (杯; 'cup ~ glass ~ bowl ~ watercraft ~ cephalopod ~ abalone')	/hái/	1; 11: /(ʑɯR) íQ-pai/; 2; 12: SJ; 3; 13: /(ʑɯR) sáN-bai/; 4; 14: (jū) yon; 6; 16: /(ʑɯR) ɾokɯ́-hai → (ʑɯR) ɾóQ-pai/; 7; 17: (jū) {nana;shichi}; 8; 18: /(ʑɯR) hacɕí-hai → (ʑɯR) háQ-pai/; 9; 19: (jū) kyū; 10; 20; 30; 40; 50; 60; 70; 80; 90: /({ni;saN;joN;ɡo;ɾokɯ;nana;hacɕi;kjɯR}-){ʑíQ;ʑɯ́Q}-pai/; 100: /hjáQ-pai/; 1,000: /séN-bai/; nan: /náN-bai/	P	CS_P* ~ CS_P_DX0*
hai (杯; 'cup ~ glass ~ bowl ~ watercraft ~ cephalopod ~ abalone')	/hái/	5: SJ	P ~ D	CS_P* ~ CS_P_DX0*
hai (杯; 'cup ~ glass ~ bowl ~ watercraft ~ cephalopod ~ abalone')	/hái/	15: /ʑɯ́R (|) ɡo-hai ~ ʑɯ́R | ɡó-hai/	XP ~ XD	CS_P* ~ CS_P_DX0*
hai (杯; 'cup ~ glass ~ bowl ~ watercraft ~ cephalopod ~ abalone')	/hái/	10,000: /icɕi-maN-bai/	D	CS_P* ~ CS_P_DX0*
hai (敗; 'loss')	/hái/	1; 11: /(ʑɯR) iQ-pai/; 2; 5; 12; 15: SJ; 3; 13: /(ʑɯR) saN-pai/; 4; 14: /(ʑɯR) joN-hai → (ʑɯR) joN-pai/; 6; 16: /(ʑɯR) ɾokɯ̥-hai → (ʑɯR) ɾoQ-pai/; 7; 17: (jū) {nana;shichi}; 8; 18: /(ʑɯR) hacɕi̥-hai → (ʑɯR) haQ-pai/; 9; 19: (jū) kyū; 10; 20: /(ni-){ʑiQ;ʑɯQ}-pai/; nan: /náN-pai/	D	CSL_D
bai (倍; 'multiplicative time')	/bai ~ bái/	1; 2; 3; 5; 6; 8; 10; 11; 12; 13; 15; 16; 18; 20; 30; 50; 60; 80; 90; 100; 200; 300; 500; 600; 800; 900: SJ; 4; 14: (jū) yon; 7; 17: (jū) nana; 9; 19: (jū) kyū; 40; 70; 400; 700: NSJ; nan	D	CSL_D
haku (拍; 'musical beat ~ Japanese mora')	/hákɯ/	1; 11: /(ʑɯR) iQ-pakɯ́/; 10: /{ʑiQ;ʑɯQ}-pakɯ́/	−1	CS_P_−1SJQK*
haku (拍; 'musical beat ~ Japanese mora')	/hákɯ/	2: SJ ~ N; 3; 13: /(ʑɯR) sáN-pakɯ/; 4; 14: /(ʑɯR) jóN-hakɯ → (ʑɯR) jóN-pakɯ/; 5; 12: SJ; 7; 17: (jū) nana; 9; 19: (jū) kyū; 20: /ni-{ʑíQ;ʑɯ́Q}-pakɯ/; nan: /náN-pakɯ/	P	CS_P_−1SJQK*
haku (拍; 'musical beat ~ Japanese mora')	/hákɯ/	6; 16: /(ʑɯR) {ɾoQ-pakɯ́;ɾokɯ́-hakɯ}/; 8; 18: /(ʑɯR) {haQ-pakɯ́;hacɕí-hakɯ}/	−1 ~ P	CS_P_−1SJQK*
haku (拍; 'musical beat ~ Japanese mora')	/hákɯ/	15: /ʑɯ́R ɡo-hakɯ ~ ʑɯ́R | ɡó-hakɯ/	XP	CS_P_−1SJQK*
haku (泊; 'night of occupancy')		1; 11: /(ʑɯR) iQ-pakɯ́/; 10: /{ʑiQ;ʑɯQ}-pakɯ́/	−1	CS_P_−1SJQK*
haku (泊; 'night of occupancy')		2: SJ ~ N; 3; 13: /(ʑɯR) sáN-pakɯ/; 4; 14: /(ʑɯR) jóN-hakɯ → (ʑɯR) jóN-pakɯ/; 5; 12: SJ; 7; 17: (jū) nana; 9; 19: (jū) kyū; 20: /ni-{ʑíQ;ʑɯ́Q}-pakɯ/; nan: /náN-pakɯ/	P	CS_P_−1SJQK*
haku (泊; 'night of occupancy')		6; 16: /(ʑɯR) {ɾoQ-pakɯ́;ɾokɯ́-hakɯ}/; 8; 18: /(ʑɯR) {haQ-pakɯ́;hacɕí-hakɯ}/	−1 ~ P	CS_P_−1SJQK*
haku (泊; 'night of occupancy')		15: /ʑɯ́R ɡo-hakɯ ~ ʑɯ́R | ɡó-hakɯ/	XP	CS_P_−1SJQK*
hako (箱; 'box')	/hako/	1; 2; 4: N; 3: /mí-hako ~ sáN-{bako;pako}/; 5: /{ɡó;itsɯ́}-hako/; 6; 16: /(ʑɯR) ɾokɯ́-hako → (ʑɯR) ɾóQ-pako/; 7; 17: (jū) nana; 8; 18: /(ʑɯR) hacɕí-hako → (ʑɯR) háQ-pako/; 9; 19: (jū) kyū; 10; 20: /(ni-){ʑíQ;ʑɯ́Q}-pako ~ tó-hako/; 11: /(ʑɯR) icɕí-hako → (ʑɯR) íQ-pako/; 12: SJ; 13: /(ʑɯR) sáN-hako → (ʑɯR) sáN-{bako;pako}/; 14: jū yon; nan: /náN-{bako;pako}/	P	CS_P
hako (箱; 'box')	/hako/	15: /ʑɯ́R ɡo-hako ~ ʑɯ́R | ɡó-hako/	XP	CS_P
basho (場所; 'sumo tournament')	/baɕo/	1; 2: N	P	CSL_D
basho (場所; 'sumo tournament')	/baɕo/	3; 5; 6; 8; 10; 11; 12; 13; 15; 16; 18; 20: SJ; 4; 14: (jū) yon; 7; 17: (jū) nana; 9; 19: (jū) kyū; nan	D	CSL_D
hashira (柱; 'deity ~ noble ~ departed soul')	/haɕiɾá ~ haɕiɾa/	1; 7: N; 5: /itsɯ̥-háɕiɾa ~ itsɯ̥́-haɕiɾa/	+1 ~ P	CSL_+1*
hashira (柱; 'deity ~ noble ~ departed soul')	/haɕiɾá ~ haɕiɾa/	2: N	+1 ~ P ~ −1	CSL_+1*
hashira (柱; 'deity ~ noble ~ departed soul')	/haɕiɾá ~ haɕiɾa/	3; nan: N; 4: yo; 5; 12; 13; 15; 20; 30; 50; 60; 80; 90: SJ; 6: /{mɯ;ɾokɯ̥;ɾokɯ}-háɕiɾa/; 8: /{ja;hacɕi̥;hacɕi}-háɕiɾa/; 9; 19: (jū) kyū; 10: to; 11: /ʑɯR {icɕi̥;icɕi}-háɕiɾa/; 14; 17: jū {yon;nana}; 16: /ʑɯR {ɾokɯ̥;ɾokɯ}-háɕiɾa/; 18: /ʑɯR {hacɕi̥;hacɕi}-háɕiɾa/; 40; 70: NSJ	+1	CSL_+1*
hachi (鉢; 'bowl ~ flowerpot ~ washtub')	/hacɕí/	1; 4: N; 3: /mí-hacɕi ~ sáN-pacɕi/; 5; 12: SJ; 7; 17: (jū) nana; 9; 19: (jū) kyū; 10: to; 11: /ʑɯR íQ-pacɕi/; 13: /ʑɯR sáN-pacɕi/; 14: jū yon; 20: /ni-{ʑíQ;ʑɯ́Q}-pacɕi/; nan: /náN-pacɕi/	P	CS_P*
hachi (鉢; 'bowl ~ flowerpot ~ washtub')	/hacɕí/	2: N; 6; 16: /{(ʑɯR) ɾokɯ́-hacɕi → (ʑɯR) ɾóQ-pacɕi} ~ (ʑɯR) ɾoQ-pacɕí/; 8; 18: /(ʑɯR) {haQ-pacɕí;háQ-pacɕi}/; 10: /{ʑíQ;ʑɯ́Q}-pacɕi ~ {ʑiQ;ʑɯQ}-pacɕí/	P ~ −1	CS_P*
hachi (鉢; 'bowl ~ flowerpot ~ washtub')	/hacɕí/	15: /ʑɯ́R ɡo-hacɕi ~ ʑɯ́R | ɡó-hacɕi/	XP	CS_P*
hatsu (発; 'gunshot')	/hátsɯ/	1; 11: /(ʑɯR) iQ-patsɯ́/; 8; 18: /(ʑɯR) haQ-patsɯ́/; 10: /{ʑiQ;ʑɯQ}-patsɯ́/; 100: /hjaQ-patsɯ́/	−1	CS_P_−1SJQK*
hatsu (発; 'gunshot')	/hátsɯ/	2; 5; 12: SJ; 3; 13: /(ʑɯR) sáN-patsɯ/; 4; 14: /(ʑɯR) jóN-hatsɯ → (ʑɯR) jóN-patsɯ/; 7; 17: (jū) nana; 9; 19: (jū) kyū; 20; 30; 40; 50; 60; 70; 80; 90: /{ni;saN;joN;ɡo;ɾokɯ;nana;hacɕi;kjɯR}-{ʑíQ;ʑɯ́Q}-patsɯ/; 1,000: /séN-patsɯ/; nan: /náN-patsɯ/	P	CS_P_−1SJQK*
hatsu (発; 'gunshot')	/hátsɯ/	6; 16: /(ʑɯR) {ɾoQ-patsɯ́;ɾokɯ́-hatsɯ}/	−1 ~ P	CS_P_−1SJQK*
hatsu (発; 'gunshot')	/hátsɯ/	15: /ʑɯ́R ɡo-hatsɯ ~ ʑɯ́R | ɡó-hatsɯ/	XP	CS_P_−1SJQK*
hatsu (発; 'gunshot')	/hátsɯ/	10,000: /icɕi-maN-patsɯ/	D	CS_P_−1SJQK*
pakku (パック; 'pack(et)')	/páQkɯ/	1: /{icɕi̥;hi̥to}-páQkɯ/; 2: SJ ~ N; 3; 5; 12; 13; 15: SJ; 4; 14: (jū) yon; 6; 16: /(ʑɯR) ɾokɯ̥-páQkɯ/; 7; 17: (jū) nana; 8; 18: /(ʑɯR) hacɕi̥-páQkɯ/; 9; 19: (jū) kyū; 10; 20: /(ni-){ʑiQ;ʑɯQ}-páQkɯ/; 11: /ʑɯR icɕi̥-páQkɯ/; nan	+1	CSL_+1
bareru ~ bāreru (バ(ー)レル; 'barrel')	/bá(R)ɾeɾɯ/	1; 2; 3; 5; 6; 8; 10; 11; 12; 13; 15; 16; 18; 20: SJ; 4; 14: (jū) yon; 7; 17: (jū) nana; 9; 19: (jū) kyū; nan	+1	CSL_+1
han (犯; 'criminal conviction')		1: /íQ-paN/; 2; 5: SJ; 3: /sáN-paN/; 4: /jóN-paN/; 6: /ɾóQ-paN/; 7: N; 8: /hacɕí-haN → háQ-paN/; 9: kyū; 10: /{ʑíQ;ʑɯ́Q}-paN/	P	CS_P
han (版; 'edition')	/háN/	1; (Note: The first edition is also shohan (初版; /ɕohaN/).) 11: /(ʑɯR) íQ-paN/; 2; 5; 12: SJ; 3; 13: /(ʑɯR) sáN-paN/; 4; 14: /(ʑɯR) jóN-haN → (ʑɯR) jóN-paN/; 6; 16: /(ʑɯR) ɾokɯ́-haN → (ʑɯR) ɾóQ-paN/; 7; 17: (jū) {nana;shichi}; 8; 18: /(ʑɯR) hacɕí-haN → (ʑɯR) háQ-paN/; 9; 19: (jū) kyū; 10; 20: /(ni-){ʑíQ;ʑɯ́Q}-paN/; nan: /náN-paN/	P	CS_P
han (版; 'edition')	/háN/	15: /ʑɯ́R ɡo-haN ~ ʑɯ́R | ɡó-haN/	XP	CS_P
han (班; 'group of people')	/háN/	1: /íQ-paN ~ iQ-páN/	P ~ +1	CS_P*
han (班; 'group of people')	/háN/	2; 5; 12: SJ; 3; 13: /(ʑɯR) sáN-paN/; 4; 14: /(ʑɯR) jóN-haN → (ʑɯR) jóN-paN/; 6; 16: /(ʑɯR) ɾokɯ́-haN → (ʑɯR) ɾóQ-paN/; 7; 17: (jū) nana; 8; 18: /(ʑɯR) hacɕí-haN → (ʑɯR) háQ-paN/; 9; 19: (jū) kyū; 10; 20: /(ni-){ʑíQ;ʑɯ́Q}-paN/; 11: /ʑɯR íQ-paN/; nan: /náN-paN/	P	CS_P*
han (班; 'group of people')	/háN/	15: /ʑɯ́R ɡo-haN ~ ʑɯ́R | ɡó-haN/	XP	CS_P*
ban (番; 'ordinal numerical label ~ ordinal rank in performance ~ sport match ~ noh play')	/báN/	1; 2; 6; 8; 10; 11; 12; 13; 16; 18; 20; 30; 50; 60; 80; 90; 100: SJ; 4; 14: (jū) yon; 7; 17: (jū) {nana;shichi}; 9; 19: (jū) kyū; 40; 70: NSJ; 1,000: sen; nan	P	CS_P_D0X0*
ban (番; 'ordinal numerical label ~ ordinal rank in performance ~ sport match ~ noh play')	/báN/	3; 5; 10,000: SJ; 4: yo; 9: ku	D	CS_P_D0X0*
ban (番; 'ordinal numerical label ~ ordinal rank in performance ~ sport match ~ noh play')	/báN/	14; 15; 19: /ʑɯ́R (|) {jo;ɡo;kɯ}-baN/	XD	CS_P_D0X0*
ban (番; 'ordinal numerical label ~ ordinal rank in performance ~ sport match ~ noh play')	/báN/	23; 33; 43; 73; 93: /{ní;sáN;jóN;naná;kjɯ́R}-ʑɯR (|) saN-baN ~ {ní;sáN;jóN;naná;kjɯ́R}-ʑɯR | sáN-baN/; 53; 63; 83: /{ɡo;ɾokɯ;hacɕi}-ʑɯR (|) {saN;sáN}-baN/	XD ~ XP	CS_P_D0X0*
ban (番; 'ordinal numerical label ~ ordinal rank in performance ~ sport match ~ noh play')	/báN/	iku: /íkɯ-baN/	PP	CS_P_D0X0*
banme (番目; 'ordinal numerical label ~ ordinal rank in performance')	/baN-me/	1st; 2nd; 3rd; 5th; 6th; 8th; 9th; 10th; 11th; 12th; 13th; 15th; 16th; 18th; 19th; 20th: SJ; 4th; 14th: (jū) yo(n); 7th; 17th: (jū) nana; nan	−1	CSL_−1
bante (番手; 'ordinal ranked performer ~ ordinal battle position ~ ordinal textile count')	/baNte/	1st; 2nd; 3rd; 5th; 6th; 8th; 10th; 11th; 12th; 13th; 15th; 16th; 18th; 20th: SJ; 4th; 14th: (jū) yo(n); 7th; 17th: (jū) nana; 9th; 19th: (jū) kyū; nan	+1	CSL_+1
banchi (番地; 'ordinal land lot')	/baNcɕi/	1st; 2nd; 3rd; 5th; 6th; 8th; 10th; 11th; 12th; 13th; 15th; 16th; 18th; 20th: SJ; 4th; 14th: (jū) yon; 7th; 17th: (jū) nana; 9th; 19th: (jū) kyū; nan	+1	CSL_+1
bi (尾; 'fish ~ crustacean')	/bí/	1; 2; 3; 5; 6; 8; 10; 11; 12; 13; 16; 18; 20: SJ; 4; 14: (jū) yon; 7; 17: (jū) {nana;shichi}; 9; 19: (jū) kyū; nan	P	CS_P
bi (尾; 'fish ~ crustacean')	/bí/	15: /ʑɯ́R ɡo-bi ~ ʑɯ́R | ɡó-bi/	XP	CS_P
pīpīemu (ppm)	/piRpiRémɯ/	1; 11: /(ʑɯR) icɕi̥-piRpiRémɯ/; 2; 3; 5; 12; 13; 15: SJ; 4; 14: (jū) yon; 6; 16: /(ʑɯR) ɾokɯ̥-piRpiRémɯ/; 7; 17: (jū) nana; 8; 18: /(ʑɯR) hacɕi̥-piRpiRémɯ/; 9; 19: (jū) kyū; 10; 20: /(ni-){ʑiQ;ʑɯQ}-piRpiRémɯ/; nan	−2	CL_M
hiki (匹; 'small animal')	/hi̥kí/	1; 11: /(ʑɯR) iQ-pi̥kí/; 10: /{ʑiQ;ʑɯQ}-pi̥kí/; 100: /hjaQ-pi̥kí/	−1	CS_P_−1SJQK*
hiki (匹; 'small animal')	/hi̥kí/	2; 5; 12: SJ; 3; 13: /(ʑɯR) sáN-biki/; 4: yon ~ SJ; 7; 17: (jū) {nana;shichi}; 9; 19: (jū) kyū; 14: jū yon; 20; 30; 40; 50; 60; 70; 80; 90: /{ni;saN;joN;ɡo;ɾokɯ;nana;hacɕi;kjɯR}-{ʑíQ;ʑɯ́Q}-pi̥ki/; 1,000: /séN-biki/; nan: /náN-biki/	P	CS_P_−1SJQK*
hiki (匹; 'small animal')	/hi̥kí/	6; 16: /(ʑɯR) {ɾoQ-pi̥kí;ɾokɯ́-hiki}/; 8; 18: /{(ʑɯR) hacɕi-hi̥kí → (ʑɯR) haQ-pi̥kí} ~ (ʑɯR) hacɕí-hi̥ki/	−1 ~ P	CS_P_−1SJQK*
hiki (匹; 'small animal')	/hi̥kí/	15: /ʑɯ́R ɡo-hi̥ki ~ ʑɯ́R | ɡó-hi̥ki/	XP	CS_P_−1SJQK*
hiki (匹; 'small animal')	/hi̥kí/	10,000: /icɕi-maN-biki/	D	CS_P_−1SJQK*
hiki (匹; 'small animal')	/hi̥kí/	iku: /íkɯ-hi̥ki/	PP	CS_P_−1SJQK*
hyō (票; 'vote')	/hjoR/	1; 11: /(ʑɯR) íQ-pjoR/; 2; 5; 12: SJ; 3; 13: /(ʑɯR) sáN-bjoR/; 4; 14: (jū) yon; 6; 16: /(ʑɯR) ɾokɯ̥́-hjoR → (ʑɯR) ɾóQ-pjoR/; 7; 17: (jū) nana; 8; 18: /(ʑɯR) hacɕí̥-hjoR → (ʑɯR) háQ-pjoR/; 9; 19: (jū) kyū; 10; 20; 30; 40; 50; 60; 70; 80; 90: /({ni;saN;joN;ɡo;ɾokɯ;nana;hacɕi;kjɯR}-){ʑíQ;ʑɯ́Q}-pjoR/; 100: /hjáQ-pjoR/; 1,000: /séN-bjoR/; nan: /náN-bjoR/	P	CS_P
hyō (票; 'vote')	/hjoR/	15: /ʑɯ́R ɡo-hjoR ~ ʑɯ́R | ɡó-hjoR/	XP	CS_P
hyō (票; 'vote')	/hjoR/	10,000: /icɕi-maN-bjoR/	D	CS_P
hyō (俵; 'bale')	/hjóR/	1: /íQ-pjoR/; 2; 5: SJ; 3: /sáN-bjoR/; 4: yon; 6: /ɾokɯ̥́-hjoR → ɾóQ-pjoR/; 7: N; 8: /hacɕí̥-hjoR → háQ-pjoR/; 9: kyū; 10: /{ʑíQ;ʑɯ́Q}-pjoR/	P	CS_P
byō (秒; 'ordinal second of the minute ~ cardinal second')	/bjóR/	1; 2; 3; 5; 6; 8; 10; 11; 12; 13; 16; 18; 40; 50; 60; 80; 100: SJ; 4; 14: (jū) yon; 7; 17: (jū) nana; 9; 19: (jū) kyū; 70: NSJ; 1,000: sen; nan	P	CS_P
byō (秒; 'ordinal second of the minute ~ cardinal second')	/bjóR/	15: /ʑɯ́R ɡo-bjoR ~ ʑɯ́R | ɡó-bjoR/	XP	CS_P
byō (秒; 'ordinal second of the minute ~ cardinal second')	/bjóR/	20; 30; 90: SJ; 40: NSJ	P ~ R	CS_P
byō (秒; 'ordinal second of the minute ~ cardinal second')	/bjóR/	10,000: SJ	D	CS_P
hin (品; 'menu dish')	/hiN/	1; (Note: As an adverb; or as a general term for 'an item'; /iQ-piN/.) 11: /(ʑɯR) íQ-piN/; 2; 5; 12: SJ; 3; 13: /(ʑɯR) sáN-piN/; 4; 14: /(ʑɯR) jóN-hiN → (ʑɯR) jóN-piN/; 6; 16: /(ʑɯR) ɾóQ-piN/; 7; 17: (jū) nana; 8; 18: /(ʑɯR) hacɕí-hiN → (ʑɯR) háQ-piN/; 9; 19: (jū) kyū; 10; 20: /(ni-){ʑíQ;ʑɯ́Q}-piN/; nan: /náN-piN/	P	CS_P
hin (品; 'menu dish')	/hiN/	15: /ʑɯ́R ɡo-hiN ~ ʑɯ́R | ɡó-hiN/	XP	CS_P
hinmoku (品目; 'type of item')	/hiNmokɯ/	1; 11: /(ʑɯR) icɕi̥-híNmokɯ/; 2; 3; 5; 12; 13; 15: SJ; 4; 14: (jū) yon; 6; 16: /(ʑɯR) ɾokɯ̥-híNmokɯ/; 7; 17: (jū) nana; 8; 18: /(ʑɯR) hacɕi̥-híNmokɯ/; 9; 19: (jū) kyū; 10; 20: /(ni-)ʑɯR-híNmokɯ → (ni-){ʑiQ;ʑɯQ}-híNmokɯ/; nan	+1	CSL_+1
bin (便; 'vehicular trip')	/bíN/	1; 2; 3; 5; 6; 8; 10; 11; 12; 13; 16; 18; 20; 30; 50; 60; 80; 90; 100: SJ; 4; 14: (jū) yon; 7; 17: (jū) nana; 9; 19: (jū) kyū; 40; 70: NSJ; 1,000: sen; nan	P ~ D	CS_P* ~ CSL_D*
bin (便; 'vehicular trip')	/bíN/	15: /{ʑɯ́R;ʑɯR} ɡo-bin ~ ʑɯ́R | ɡó-biN/	XP ~ D	CS_P* ~ CSL_D*
bin (便; 'vehicular trip')	/bíN/	10,000: SJ	D	CS_P* ~ CSL_D*
bu (部; 'book copy (set)')	/bɯ́ ~ bɯ/	1; 2; 3; 5; 6; 8; 10; 11; 12; 13; 16; 18; 20: SJ; 4; 14: (jū) yon; 7; 17: (jū) nana; 9; 19: (jū) kyū; nan	P	CS_P
bu (部; 'book copy (set)')	/bɯ́ ~ bɯ/	15: /ʑɯ́R ɡo-bɯ ~ ʑɯ́R | ɡó-bɯ/	XP	CS_P
bu (分; 'bu ~ tenth ~ hundredth ~ per cent')	/bɯ/	1; 2; 3; 5; 6; 8; 9; 10: SJ; 4: yon ~ SJ; 7: N ~ SJ; nan	P	CS_P
busode (分袖; '-tenth sleeve') butake (分丈; '-tenth garment length')		1; 2; 3; 4; 5; 6; 7; 8; 10: SJ; 9: ku; nan	+1	CSL_+1
buzaki (分咲き; 'tenth in full bloom of cherry blossoms')		1; 2; 3; 4; 5; 6; 7; 8: SJ; 9: ku; nan	D	CSL_D
bunme (分目; 'tenth')		1; 2; 3; 5; 6; 8: SJ; 4: yon; 7; nan: N; 9: kyū	−1 ~ D	CSL_−1* ~ CSL_D*
fun (分; 'fun ~ ordinal minute of the hour ~ cardinal temporal minute ~ angular minute')	/ɸɯ́N/	1; 11: /(ʑɯR) íQ-pɯN/; 2; 5; 12: SJ; 3; 13: /(ʑɯR) sáN-pɯN/; 4; 14: /(ʑɯR) jóN-pɯN/; 6; 16: /(ʑɯR) ɾóQ-pɯN/; 7; 17: (jū) nana; 8; 18: /(ʑɯR) hacɕí-ɸɯN → (ʑɯR) háQ-pɯN/; 9; 19: (jū) kyū; 10; 50; 60; 70; 80: /({ɡo;ɾokɯ;nana;hacɕi}-){ʑíQ;ʑɯ́Q}-pɯN/; 100: /hjáQ-pɯN/; 1,000: /séN-pɯN/; nan: /náN-pɯN/	P	CS_P
fun (分; 'fun ~ ordinal minute of the hour ~ cardinal temporal minute ~ angular minute')	/ɸɯ́N/	15: /ʑɯ́R ɡo-ɸɯN ~ ʑɯ́R | ɡó-ɸɯN/	XP	CS_P
fun (分; 'fun ~ ordinal minute of the hour ~ cardinal temporal minute ~ angular minute')	/ɸɯ́N/	20; 30; 40; 90: /{{ni;saN;joN;kjɯR}-{ʑíQ;ʑɯ́Q};{ní;sáN;jóN;kjɯ́R}-{ʑiQ;ʑɯQ}}-pɯN/	P ~ R	CS_P
fun (分; 'fun ~ ordinal minute of the hour ~ cardinal temporal minute ~ angular minute')	/ɸɯ́N/	10,000: /icɕi-maN-pɯN/	D	CS_P
fīto (フィート; 'foot')	/ɸíRto/	1; 11: /(ʑɯR) icɕi̥-ɸíRto/; 2; 3; 5; 12; 13; 15: SJ; 4; 14: (jū) yon; 6; 16: /(ʑɯR) ɾokɯ̥-ɸíRto/; 7; 17: (jū) nana; 8; 18: /(ʑɯR) hacɕi̥-ɸíRto/; 9; 19: (jū) kyū; 10; 20: /(ni-){ʑiQ;ʑɯQ}-ɸíRto/; nan	+1	CSL_+1
fukuro (袋; 'bag')	/ɸɯ̥kɯɾó/	1; 2; 7: N; 6; 8: SJ	+1 ~ P	CSL_+1*
fukuro (袋; 'bag')	/ɸɯ̥kɯɾó/	3: N ~ SJ; 4; nan: N; 5; 11; 12; 13; 15; 16; 18; 100; 1,000; 10,000: SJ; 9; 19: (jū) kyū; 10; 20; 30; 40; 50; 60; 70; 80; 90: /({ni;saN;joN;ɡo;ɾokɯ;nana;hacɕi;kjɯR}-){ʑiQ;ʑɯQ}-pɯ̥́kɯɾo/; 14: jū yon; 17: jū nana	+1	CSL_+1*
fukuro (袋; 'bag')	/ɸɯ̥kɯɾó/	21; 22; 23; 24; 26; 27; 28; 31; 32; 33; 34; 36; 37; 38; 41; 42; 43; 44; 46; 47; 48; 71; 72; 73; 74; 76; 77; 78; 91; 92; 93; 94; 96; 97; 98: /{ní;sáN;jóN;naná;kjɯ́R}-ʑɯR {icɕi;ni;saN;joN;ɾokɯ;nana;hacɕi}-ɸɯ̥kɯɾo ~ {ní;sáN;jóN;naná;kjɯ́R}-ʑɯR | {icɕi;ni;saN;joN;ɾokɯ;nana;hacɕi}-ɸɯ̥́kɯɾo/; 51; 52; 53; 54; 56; 57; 58; 61; 62; 63; 64; 66; 67; 68; 81; 82; 83; 84; 86; 87; 88: /{ɡo;ɾokɯ;hacɕi}-ʑɯR (|) {icɕi;ni;saN;joN;ɾokɯ;nana;hacɕi}-ɸɯ̥́kɯɾo/	X+1	CSL_+1*
furan (フラン; 'franc')	/ɸɯ́ɾaN/	1: /icɕi̥-ɸɯ́ɾaN/; 2; 3; 5: SJ; 4: yon; 6: /ɾokɯ̥-ɸɯ́ɾaN/; 7: N; 8: /hacɕi̥-ɸɯ́ɾaN/; 9: kyū; 10: /ʑɯR-ɸɯ́ɾaN → {ʑiQ;ʑɯQ}-ɸɯ́ɾaN/	+1	CSL_+1
furi (振り; 'swinging motion ~ sword')	/ɸɯɾi ~ ɸɯɾí/	1; 2; 3; 7: N; 4: yo; 5; 6; 8: SJ; 9: kyū; 10: /{ʑíQ;ʑɯ́Q}-ɸɯɾi/	P	CS_P
burokku (ブロック; 'block')	/bɯɾóQkɯ/	1; 2: SJ ~ N; 3; 5; 6; 8; 10; 11; 12; 13; 16; 18; 20: SJ; 4; 14: (jū) yon; 7; 17: (jū) nana; 9; 19: (jū) kyū; nan	−3	CL_M
heihō senchimētoru (平方センチメートル; 'square centimetre')	/heihoR seNcɕiméRtoɾɯ/	1; 11: /(ʑɯR) icɕi̥-heihoR-seNcɕiméRtoɾɯ/; 2; 3; 5; 10; 12; 13; 15; 20: SJ; 4; 14: (jū) yon; 6; 16: /(ʑɯR) ɾokɯ̥-heihoR-seNcɕiméRtoɾɯ/; 7; 17: (jū) nana; 8; 18: /(ʑɯR) hacɕi̥-heihoR-seNcɕiméRtoɾɯ/; 9; 19: (jū) kyū; nan	−4	CL_M
heihō mētoru (平方メートル; 'square metre')	/heihoR méRtoɾɯ/	1; 11: /(ʑɯR) icɕi̥-heihoR-méRtoɾɯ/; 2; 3; 5; 10; 12; 13; 15; 20: SJ; 4; 14: (jū) yon; 6; 16: /(ʑɯR) ɾokɯ̥-heihoR-méRtoɾɯ/; 7; 17: (jū) nana; 8; 18: /(ʑɯR) hacɕi̥-heihoR-méRtoɾɯ/; 9; 19: (jū) kyū; nan	−4	CL_M
pēji (ページ; 'page')	/peRʑi/	1; 11: /(ʑɯR) icɕi̥-péRʑi → (ʑɯR) iQ-péRʑi/; 2; 3; 5; 12; 13; 15: SJ; 4; 14: (jū) yon; 6; 16: /(ʑɯR) ɾokɯ̥-péRʑi/; 7; 17: (jū) nana; 8; 18: /(ʑɯR) hacɕi̥-péRʑi → (ʑɯR) haQ-péRʑi/; 9; 19: (jū) kyū; 10; 20: /(ni-){ʑiQ;ʑɯQ}-péRʑi/; nan	+1	CSL_+1
hekutāru (ヘクタール; 'hectare')	/hekɯ̥táRɾɯ/	1; 11: /(ʑɯR) icɕi̥-hekɯ̥táRɾɯ/; 2; 3; 5; 10; 12; 13; 15; 20: SJ; 4; 14: (jū) yon; 6; 16: /(ʑɯR) ɾokɯ̥-hekɯ̥táRɾɯ/; 7; 17: (jū) {nana;shichi}; 8; 18: /(ʑɯR) hacɕi̥-hekɯ̥táRɾɯ/; 9; 19: (jū) kyū; nan; iku: /ikɯ̥-hekɯ̥táRɾɯ/	−3	CL_M
hekutopaskaru (ヘクトパスカル; 'hectopascal')	/hekɯ̥topásɯ̥kaɾɯ/	1; 11: /(ʑɯR) icɕi̥-hekɯ̥topásɯ̥kaɾɯ/; 2; 3; 5; 10; 12; 13; 15; 20: SJ; 4; 14: (jū) yon; 6; 16: /(ʑɯR) ɾokɯ̥-hekɯ̥topásɯ̥kaɾɯ/; 7; 17: (jū) nana; 8; 18: /(ʑɯR) hacɕi̥-hekɯ̥topásɯ̥kaɾɯ/; 9; 19: (jū) kyū; nan	−4	CL_M
hekutorittoru (ヘクトリットル; 'hectolitre')	/hekɯ̥toɾíQtoɾɯ/	1: /(ʑɯR) icɕi̥-hekɯ̥toɾíQtoɾɯ/; 2; 3; 5; 10: SJ; 4: (jū) yon; 6: /(ʑɯR) ɾokɯ̥-hekɯ̥toɾíQtoɾɯ/; 7: (jū) {nana;shichi}; 8: /(ʑɯR) hacɕi̥-hekɯ̥toɾíQtoɾɯ/; 9: (jū) kyū; nan; iku: /ikɯ̥-hekɯ̥toɾíQtoɾɯ/	−4	CL_M
bekureru (ベクレル; 'becquerel')	/békɯɾeɾɯ/	1; 2; 3; 5; 6; 8; 10; 11; 12; 13; 15; 16; 18; 20: SJ; 4; 14: (jū) yon; 7; 17: (jū) nana; 9; 19: (jū) kyū; nan	+1	CSL_+1
peso (ペソ)	/péso/	1: /icɕi̥-péso/; 2; 3; 5: SJ; 4: yon; 6: /ɾokɯ̥-péso/; 7: N; 8: /hacɕi̥-péso/; 9: kyū; 10: /{ʑiQ;ʑɯQ}-péso/	+1	CSL_+1
heya (部屋; 'room')	/hejá/	1; 2; 4; nan: N; 3: N ~ SJ; 5: /{ɡó;itsɯ̥́}-heja/; 6; 16: /(ʑɯR) {ɾokɯ́;ɾokɯ̥́}-heja/; 7; 17: (jū) nana; 8; 18: /(ʑɯR) {hacɕí;hacɕí̥}-heja/; 9; 19: (jū) kyū; 10: /{ʑíQ;ʑɯ́Q;tó}-heja/; 11: /ʑɯR {icɕí;icɕí̥}-heja/; 12; 13: SJ; 14: jū yon; 20: /ni-{ʑíQ;ʑɯ́Q}-heja/	P	CS_P
heya (部屋; 'room')	/hejá/	15: /ʑɯ́R ɡo-heja ~ ʑɯ́R | ɡó-heja/	XP	CS_P
herutsu (ヘルツ; 'hertz')	/héɾɯtsɯ/	1; 11: /(ʑɯR) {icɕi̥;icɕi}-héɾɯtsɯ/; 2; 3; 5; 12; 13; 15: SJ; 4; 14: (jū) yon; 6; 16: /(ʑɯR) ɾokɯ̥-héɾɯtsɯ/; 7; 17: (jū) nana; 8; 18: /(ʑɯR) hacɕi̥-héɾɯtsɯ/; 9; 19: (jū) kyū; 10; 20: /(ni-){ʑiQ;ʑɯQ}-héɾɯtsɯ/; nan	+1	CSL_+1
hen (編; 'textual composition ~ instalment in a book series')	/héN/	1: /íQ-peN ~ iQ-péN ~ iQ-peN/	P ~ +1 ~ D	CS_P*
hen (編; 'textual composition ~ instalment in a book series')	/héN/	2; 5; 12: SJ; 3; 13: /(ʑɯR) sáN-peN/; 4; 14: /(ʑɯR) jóN-heN → (ʑɯR) jóN-peN/; 6; 16: /(ʑɯR) {ɾokɯ́;ɾokɯ̥́}-heN → (ʑɯR) ɾóQ-peN/; 7; 17: (jū) {nana;shichi}; 8; 18: /(ʑɯR) {hacɕí;hacɕí̥}-heN → (ʑɯR) háQ-peN/; 9; 19: (jū) kyū; 10; 20: /(ni-){ʑíQ;ʑɯ́Q}-peN/; 11: /ʑɯR íQ-peN/; nan: /náN-peN/	P	CS_P*
hen (編; 'textual composition ~ instalment in a book series')	/héN/	15: /ʑɯ́R ɡo-heN ~ ʑɯ́R | ɡó-heN/	XP	CS_P*
hen (遍; 'occurrence')		1: /íQ-peN/; 2; 5: SJ; 3: /sáN-beN/; 4: yon; 6: /ɾóQ-peN/; 7: N ~ SJ; 8: /hacɕí̥-heN → háQ-peN/; 9: kyū; 10: /{ʑíQ;ʑɯ́Q}-peN/	P	CS_P
ho (歩; 'footstep')	/hó/	1; 11: /(ʑɯR) íQ-po/; 2; 5; 12: SJ; 3; 13: /(ʑɯR) sáN-{po;bo}/; 4; 14: /(ʑɯR) jóN-ho → (ʑɯR) jóN-po/; 6; 16: /(ʑɯR) ɾóQ-po/; 7; 17: (jū) nana; 8; 18: /(ʑɯR) hacɕí-ho → (ʑɯR) háQ-po/; 9; 19: (jū) kyū; 10; 20: /(ni-){ʑíQ;ʑɯ́Q}-po/; 100: /hjáQ-po/; nan: /náN-{po;bo}/	P	CS_P
ho (歩; 'footstep')	/hó/	15: /ʑɯ́R ɡo-ho ~ ʑɯ́R | ɡó-ho/	XP	CS_P
pointo (ポイント; 'point')	/poiNto/	1; 11: /(ʑɯR) icɕi̥-póiNto → (ʑɯR) iQ-póiNto/; 2; 3; 5; 12; 13; 15: SJ; 4; 14: (jū) yon; 6; 16: /(ʑɯR) ɾokɯ̥-póiNto/; 7; 17: (jū) {nana;shichi}; 8; 18: /(ʑɯR) hacɕi̥-póiNto → (ʑɯR) haQ-póiNto/; 9; 19: (jū) kyū; 10; 20: /(ni-){ʑiQ;ʑɯQ}-póiNto/; nan	+1	CSL_+1
boruto (ボルト; 'volt')	/boɾɯto ~ bóɾɯto/	1; 2; 3; 5; 6; 8; 10; 11; 12; 13; 15; 16; 18; 20: SJ; 4; 14: (jū) yon; 7; 17: (jū) nana; 9; 19: (jū) kyū; nan	+1	CSL_+1
hon (本; 'long and thin object ~ point in martial arts')	/hóN/	1; 11: /(ʑɯR) íQ-poN/; 2; 12: SJ; 3; 13: /(ʑɯR) sáN-boN/; 4; 14: (jū) yon; 6; 16: /(ʑɯR) ɾokɯ́-hoN → (ʑɯR) ɾóQ-poN/; 7; 17: (jū) nana; 8; 18: /(ʑɯR) hacɕí-hoN → (ʑɯR) háQ-poN/; 9; 19: (jū) kyū; 10; 50; 60; 70; 80: /({ɡo;ɾokɯ;nana;hacɕi}-){ʑíQ;ʑɯ́Q}-poN/; 100: /hjáQ-poN/; 1,000: /séN-boN/; nan: /náN-boN/	P	CS_P_DX0
hon (本; 'long and thin object ~ point in martial arts')	/hóN/	5: SJ; 10,000: /icɕi-maN-boN/	D	CS_P_DX0
hon (本; 'long and thin object ~ point in martial arts')	/hóN/	15: /ʑɯ́R (|) ɡo-hoN/	XD	CS_P_DX0
hon (本; 'long and thin object ~ point in martial arts')	/hóN/	20; 30; 40; 90: /{{ni;saN;joN;kjɯR}-{ʑíQ;ʑɯ́Q};{ní;sáN;jóN;kjɯ́R}-{ʑiQ;ʑɯQ}}-poN/	P ~ R	CS_P_DX0
pondo (ポンド; 'pound')	/póNdo/	1; 11: /(ʑɯR) icɕi̥-póNdo/; 2; 3; 5; 12; 13; 15: SJ; 4; 14: (jū) yon; 6; 16: /(ʑɯR) ɾokɯ̥-póNdo/; 7; 17: (jū) nana; 8; 18: /(ʑɯR) hacɕi̥-póNdo/; 9; 19: (jū) kyū; 10; 20: /(ni-){ʑiQ;ʑɯQ}-póNdo/; nan	+1	CSL_+1
mai (枚; 'thin and flat object ~ paddy ~ plantation ~ sumo ranking place on the roster ~ sumo division's wrestler ~ tayū ~ nagauta singer ~ kago bearer')		1; 2; 3; 6; 8; 10; 11; 12; 13; 16; 18; 20; 100: SJ; 4; 14: (jū) yon; 7; 17: (jū) {nana;shichi}; 9; 19: (jū) kyū; nan	P	CS_P_DX0
mai (枚; 'thin and flat object ~ paddy ~ plantation ~ sumo ranking place on the roster ~ sumo division's wrestler ~ tayū ~ nagauta singer ~ kago bearer')		4: yo; 5: SJ; 9: ku	D	CS_P_DX0
mai (枚; 'thin and flat object ~ paddy ~ plantation ~ sumo ranking place on the roster ~ sumo division's wrestler ~ tayū ~ nagauta singer ~ kago bearer')		14; 15: /ʑɯ́R (|) {jo;ɡo}-mai/	XD	CS_P_DX0
maikuromētoru (マイクロメートル; 'micrometre')	/maikɯɾoméRtoɾɯ/	1; 2; 3; 5; 6; 8; 10; 11; 12; 13; 15; 16; 18; 20: SJ; 4; 14: (jū) yon; 7; 17: (jū) nana; 9; 19: (jū) kyū; nan	−4	CL_M
mairu (マイル; 'mile')	/máiɾɯ/	1; 2; 3; 5; 6; 8; 10; 11; 12; 13; 15; 16; 18; 20: SJ; 4; 14: (jū) yon; 7; 17: (jū) nana; 9; 19: (jū) kyū; nan	+1	CSL_+1
maku (幕; 'theatrical act')	/makɯ́/	1; 4; nan: N; 3: SJ ~ N; 5; 6; 8; 10; 11; 12; 13; 16; 18; 20: SJ; 7; 17: (jū) {nana;shichi}; 9; 19: (jū) kyū; 14: jū yon	P	CS_P
maku (幕; 'theatrical act')	/makɯ́/	2: N	P ~ −1	CS_P
maku (幕; 'theatrical act')	/makɯ́/	15: /ʑɯ́R ɡo-makɯ ~ ʑɯ́R | ɡó-makɯ/; dai {1 (Note: Alternatively; jomaku (序幕; /ʑomakɯ/ 'the first act').);2;3;4;7;17}: /dái {icɕi;ni;saN;joN;(ʑɯR) nana}-makɯ ~ dái | {icɕí;ní;sáN;jóN;(ʑɯR) naná}-makɯ/	XP	CS_P
makume (幕目; 'ordinal kabuki act')		1st; 2nd; 3rd; 5th; 6th; 7th: N; 4th: yo; 8th; 10th: SJ; 9th: kyū; nan	−1	CSL_−1
maruku (マルク; 'mark')	/máɾɯkɯ/	1; 2; 3; 5; 6; 8; 10: SJ; 4: yon; 7: N; 9: kyū	+1	CSL_+1
man (万; 'ten thousand')	/máN/	1; 3; 5; 6; 8; 9; 10; 11; 12; 13; 16; 18; 100; 1,000: SJ; 2: SJ ~ N; 4; 14: (jū) yon; 7; 17: (jū) {nana;shichi}; 19: jū kyū	+1	CSL_+1*
man (万; 'ten thousand')	/máN/	15: /ʑɯ́R ɡo-maN ~ ʑɯ́R | ɡo-máN ~ ʑɯR ɡo-máN/	X+1 ~ +1	CSL_+1*
man (万; 'ten thousand')	/máN/	19: /ʑɯ́R kɯ-maN ~ ʑɯ́R | kɯ-máN/	X+1	CSL_+1*
man (万; 'ten thousand')	/máN/	20; 30; 90; 300; 900: SJ; 40; 70; 400; 700; {nan;iku} {10;100;1,000}: NSJ	+1 ~ P ~ R	CSL_+1*
man (万; 'ten thousand')	/máN/	20; 4,000: NSJ; 40; 50; 60; 70; 80; 400; 500; 600; 700; 800; 3,000; 5,000; 6,000; 8,000; 9,000: SJ; 200; 2,000; 7,000: SJ ~ NSJ; nan	+1 ~ P	CSL_+1*
man (万; 'ten thousand')	/máN/	iku	+1 ~ PP	CSL_+1*
mikuron (ミクロン; 'micron')	/míkɯɾoN/	1; 2; 3; 5; 6; 8; 10: SJ; 4: yon; 7: N; 9: kyū	+1	CSL_+1
miri (ミリ; 'millimetre')	/míɾi/	1; 2; 3; 5; 6; 8; 10; 11; 12; 13; 16; 18; 20; 30; 50; 60; 80; 90; 100: SJ; 4; 14: (jū) yon; 7; 17: (jū) nana; 9; 19: (jū) kyū; 40; 70: NSJ; 1,000: sen; nan	P	CS_P
miri (ミリ; 'millimetre')	/míɾi/	15: /ʑɯ́R ɡo-miɾi ~ ʑɯ́R | ɡó-miɾi/	XP	CS_P
miri (ミリ; 'millimetre')	/míɾi/	10,000: SJ	D	CS_P
mirimētoru (ミリメートル; 'millimetre')	/miɾiméRtoɾɯ/	1; 2; 3; 5; 6; 8; 10; 11; 12; 13; 15; 16; 18; 20: SJ; 4; 14: (jū) yon; 7; 17: (jū) nana; 9; 19: (jū) kyū; nan	−4	CL_M
miririttoru (ミリリットル; 'millilitre')	/miɾiɾíQtoɾɯ/	1; 2; 3; 5; 6; 8; 10; 11; 12; 13; 15; 16; 18; 20: SJ; 4; 14: (jū) yon; 7; 17: (jū) nana; 9; 19: (jū) kyū; nan	−4	CL_M
mune (棟; 'building')	/mɯné ~ mɯne/	1; 2; 4; nan: N; 3; 5; 10: SJ ~ N; 6; 8; 11; 12; 13; 16; 18; 20; 30; 50; 60; 80; 90; 100: SJ; 7; 17: (jū) nana; 9; 19: (jū) kyū; 14: jū yon; 40; 70: NSJ; 1,000: sen	P	CS_P
mune (棟; 'building')	/mɯné ~ mɯne/	15: /ʑɯ́R ɡo-mɯne ~ ʑɯ́R | ɡó-mɯne/; 21; 22; 23; 24; 25; 31; 32; 33; 34; 35; 41; 42; 43; 44; 45; 71; 72; 73; 74; 75; 91; 92; 93; 94; 95: /{ní;sáN;jóN;naná;kjɯ́R}-ʑɯR {icɕi;ni;saN;joN;ɡo}-mɯne ~ {ní;sáN;jóN;naná;kjɯ́R}-ʑɯR | {icɕí;ní;sáN;jóN;ɡó}-mɯne/; 51; 52; 53; 54; 55; 61; 62; 63; 64; 65; 81; 82; 83; 84; 85: /{ɡo;ɾokɯ;hacɕi}-ʑɯR (|) {icɕí;ní;sáN;jóN;ɡó}-mɯne/	XP	CS_P
mune (棟; 'building')	/mɯné ~ mɯne/	10,000: SJ	D	CS_P
mei (名; 'person')	/méi/	1; 2; 3; 5; 6; 8; 10; 11; 12; 13; 16; 18; 20: SJ; 4; nan: N; 7; 17: (jū) {nana;shichi}; 9; 19: (jū) kyū; 14: jū yon	P	CS_P
mei (名; 'person')	/méi/	14; 15: /ʑɯ́R {jo;ɡo}-mei ~ ʑɯ́R | {jó;ɡó}-mei/	XP	CS_P
mētoru (メートル; 'metre')	/meRtoɾɯ/	1; 2; 3; 5; 6; 8; 10; 11; 12; 13; 15; 16; 18; 20: SJ; 4; 14: (jū) yon; 7; 17: (jū) {nana;shichi}; 9; 19: (jū) kyū; nan; iku	+1	CSL_+1
mō (毛)	/móR/	1; 2; 3; 5; 6; 8; 10: SJ; 4: yon; 7: N ~ SJ; 9: kyū	P	CS_P
moku (目; 'go eye')	/mókɯ/	1; (Note: But ichimoku oku (一目置く; /icɕi-mokɯ okɯ ~ icɕí-mokɯ okɯ/ 'yields one eye → accepts one's own inferiority'). The other senses of ichimoku; such as 'one look ~ one view' also accepts /icɕi-mokɯ ~ icɕí-mokɯ/.) 2; 3; 5; 6; 8; 10; (Note: But /ʑɯR-mokɯ/ is used for 'everyone's point of view'.) 11; 12; 13; 16; 18; 20: SJ; 4; 14: (jū) yon; 7; 17: (jū) {nana;shichi}; 9; 19: (jū) kyū; nan	P	CS_P
moku (目; 'go eye')	/mókɯ/	15: /ʑɯ́R | ɡo-mokɯ ~ ʑɯ́R | ɡó-mokɯ/	XP	CS_P
mon (問; 'question')		1; 2; 3; 6; 8; 10; 11; 12; 13; 16; 18; 20: SJ; 4; 14: (jū) yon; 7; 17: (jū) {nana;shichi}; 9; 19: (jū) kyū; nan	P	CS_P_DX0* ~ CS_P*
mon (問; 'question')		5: SJ	D ~ P	CS_P_DX0* ~ CS_P*
mon (問; 'question')		15: /ʑɯ́R (|) ɡo-moN ~ ʑɯ́R | ɡó-moN/	XD ~ XP	CS_P_DX0* ~ CS_P*
mon (文; 'wén → monetary mon')	/móN/	1; 2; 3; 5; 6; 8; 10; 11; 12; 13; 16; 18; 20; han: SJ; 4; 14: (jū) yon; 7; 17: (jū) {nana;shichi}; 9; 19: (jū) kyū; nan	P	CS_P
mon (文; 'wén → monetary mon')	/móN/	15: /ʑɯ́R ɡo-moN ~ ʑɯ́R | ɡó-moN/	XP	CS_P
mon (文; 'footwear-length mon')	/móN/	1; 2; 3; 5; 6; 8; 11; 12; 13; 16; 18; 20; han: SJ; 4; 14: (jū) yon; 7; 17: (jū) {nana;shichi}; 9; 19: (jū) kyū; 10: to; nan	P	CS_P
mon (文; 'footwear-length mon')	/móN/	15: /ʑɯ́R ɡo-moN ~ ʑɯ́R | ɡó-moN/	XP	CS_P
monme (匁)	/moN-mé/	1; 2; 3; 5; 6; 8; 9; 10; 11; 12; 13; 15; 16; 18; 19: SJ; 4; 14: (jū) yon; 7; 17: (jū) {nana;shichi}; nan; iku	−1	CSL_−1
ya (夜; 'night')		1; 2; 3; 5; 6; 8; 9; 10; (Note: The ten nights of niànfó in Japanese Pure Land Buddhism is /ʑɯ́R-ja ~ ʑɯR-ja/.) 11; 12; 13; 16; 17; 18; 20; 1,001; (Note: One Thousand and One Nights.) han: SJ; 4; 14: (jū) yon; 7; nan: N; 19: jū kyū	P	CS_P*
ya (夜; 'night')		7: SJ	P ~ +1	CS_P*
ya (夜; 'night')		15: /ʑɯ́R ɡo-ja ~ ʑɯ́R | ɡó-ja/	XP	CS_P*
ya (夜; 'special ordinal night of the lunar month')		13th; 16th (Note: Alternatively; /izajoi/.): SJ	P ~ D	
ya (夜; 'special ordinal night of the lunar month')		15th: SJ	D	
yo (夜; 'night')	/jó/	1; 2; 7: N	P	CS_P
yādo (ヤード; 'yard')	/jáRdo/	1; 2; 3; 5; 6; 8; 10; 11; 12; 13; 15; 16; 18; 20: SJ; 4; 14: (jū) yon; 7; 17: (jū) nana; 9; 19: (jū) kyū; nan	+1	CSL_+1
yaku (役; 'role')	/jakɯ́/	1; 2 (Note: /ɸɯ̥tá-jakɯ ~ ɸɯ̥ta-jakɯ́ ~ ɸɯ̥ta-jakɯ/ are used for a 'dual role' or 'two simultaneous roles'; as in kaichō to hanchō no futayaku o tantō shite iru (会長と班長の二役を担当する; 'serves as both the president and the squad leader').): N; 3; 5; 6; 8; 10; 11; 12; 13; 16; 18; 20: SJ; 4; 14: (jū) yon; 7; 17: (jū) nana; 9; 19: (jū) kyū; nan	P	CS_P
yaku (役; 'role')	/jakɯ́/	15: /ʑɯ́R ɡo-jakɯ ~ ʑɯ́R | ɡó-jakɯ/	XP	CS_P
yaku (役; 'role')	/jakɯ́/	han	D	CS_P
yūro (ユーロ; 'euro')	/jɯ́Rɾo/	1; 2; 3; 5; 6; 8; 10; 11; 12; 13; 15; 16; 18; 20: SJ; 4; 14: (jū) yon; 7; 17: (jū) nana; 9; 19: (jū) kyū; nan	+1	CSL_+1
ri (里)	/ɾí/	1; 2; 3; 5; 6; 7; 8; 9; 10; 11; 12; 13; 16; 17; 18; 100; han: SJ; 4; nan: N; 14; 19: jū {yon;kyū}; 1,000: sen	P	CS_P
ri (里)	/ɾí/	14; 15; 19: /ʑɯ́R {jo;ɡo;kɯ}-ɾi ~ ʑɯ́R | {jó;ɡó;kɯ́}-ɾi/	XP	CS_P
ri (里)	/ɾí/	20: SJ	P ~ R	CS_P
ri (人; 'person')		1: N	P	
ri (人; 'person')		2: N	−1	
tari (人; 'person')		3: N	P	
tari (人; 'person')		4: /joQ-{taɾí;táɾi} ~ jó-taɾi/	−1 ~ +1 ~ P	
nin (人; 'person')	/níN/	1; 6; 8; 10; 11; 12; 13; 16; 18; 40; 50; 60; 70; 80; 100; 200; 500; 600; 700; 800: SJ; 7; 17: (jū) {shichi;nana}; 9; 19: (jū) kyū; 1,000: sen; nan	P	
nin (人; 'person')	/níN/	2: SJ	P ~ +1	
nin (人; 'person')	/níN/	3; 5: SJ; 4: yo; 9: ku	+1	
nin (人; 'person')	/níN/	14; 15; 19: /ʑɯ́R {jo;ɡo;kɯ}-niN ~ ʑɯ́R | {jo;ɡo;kɯ}-níN/; 24; 34; 44; 74; 94: /{ní;sáN;jóN;naná;kjɯ́R}-ʑɯR jo-niN ~ {ní;sáN;jóN;naná;kjɯ́R}-ʑɯR | jo-níN/; 54; 64; 84: /{ɡo;ɾokɯ;hacɕi}-ʑɯR (|) jo-níN/	X+1	
nin (人; 'person')	/níN/	20; 30; 90; 300; 900: SJ; 40; 70; 400; 700: NSJ	P ~ R	
nin (人; 'person')	/níN/	21; 22; 31; 32; 41; 42; 71; 72; 91; 92: /{ní;sáN;jóN;naná;kjɯ́R}-ʑɯR {icɕi;ni}-niN ~ {ní;sáN;jóN;naná;kjɯ́R}-ʑɯR | {icɕí;ní}-niN/; 51; 52; 61; 62; 81; 82: /{ɡo;ɾokɯ;hacɕi}-ʑɯR (|) {icɕí;ní}-niN/	XP	
nin (人; 'person')	/níN/	23; 33; 43; 73; 93: /{ní;sáN;jóN;naná;kjɯ́R}-ʑɯR saN-niN ~ {ní;sáN;jóN;naná;kjɯ́R}-ʑɯR | {sáN-niN;saN-níN}/; 53; 63; 83: /{ɡo;ɾokɯ;hacɕi}-ʑɯR (|) {sáN-niN;saN-níN}/	XP ~ X+1	
nin (人; 'person')	/níN/	2,000; 3,000; 5,000; 6,000; 8,000; 9,000; 10,000; 100,000; 1,000,000: SJ; 4,000; 7,000: NSJ	D	
rimae (人前; 'person's allotment')		1; 2: N	D	CSL_D
tarimae (人前; 'person's allotment')		3: N; 4: /jo(Q)-taɾi-mae/	D	CSL_D
ninmae (人前; 'person's allotment')		1; 2; 3; 5; 6; 8; 9; 10; 11; 12; 13; 15; 16; 18; 19; 20; han: SJ; 4; 14: (jū) yo; 7; 17: (jū) {shichi;nana}; nan; iku	D	CSL_D
rittoru (リットル; 'litre')	/ɾiQtoɾɯ/	1; 2; 3; 5; 6; 8; 10; 11; 12; 13; 15; 16; 18; 20: SJ; 4; 14: (jū) yon; 7; 17: (jū) nana; 9; 19: (jū) kyū; nan	+1	CSL_+1
rippō senchimētoru (立法センチメートル; 'cubic centimetre')	/ɾiQpoR seNcɕiméRtoɾɯ/	1; 11: /(ʑɯR) icɕi-ɾiQpoR-seNcɕiméRtoɾɯ/; 2; 3; 5; 10; 12; 13; 15; 20: SJ; 4; 14: (jū) yon; 6; 16: /(ʑɯR) ɾokɯ-ɾiQpoR-seNcɕiméRtoɾɯ/; 7; 17: (jū) nana; 8; 18: /(ʑɯR) hacɕi-ɾiQpoR-seNcɕiméRtoɾɯ/; 9; 19: (jū) kyū; nan	−4	CL_M
rippō mētoru (立法メートル; 'cubic metre')	/ɾiQpoR méRtoɾɯ/	1; 11: /(ʑɯR) icɕi-ɾiQpoR-méRtoɾɯ/; 2; 3; 5; 10; 12; 13; 15; 20: SJ; 4; 14: (jū) yon; 6; 16: /(ʑɯR) ɾokɯ-ɾiQpoR-méRtoɾɯ/; 7; 17: (jū) nana; 8; 18: /(ʑɯR) hacɕi-ɾiQpoR-méRtoɾɯ/; 9; 19: (jū) kyū; nan	−4	CL_M
ryō (両; 'liǎng ~ pair of objects ~ set of clothes ~ suit of armor')	/ɾjóR/	1; 2; 3; 5; 6; 8; 10; 11; 12; 13; 16; 18; 20; 100: SJ; 4; 14: (jū) yon; 7; 17: (jū) nana; 9; 19: (jū) kyū; nan	+1 ~ P	CSL_+1* ~ CS_P* ~ CS_P_+1S!+1* ~ CS_P_+1S!+1!0* ~ CS_P_+1SJ*
ryō (両; 'liǎng ~ pair of objects ~ set of clothes ~ suit of armor')	/ɾjóR/	15: /ʑɯ́R ɡo-ɾjoR ~ ʑɯ́R | {ɡo-ɾjóR;ɡó-ɾjoR}/	X+1 ~ XP	CSL_+1* ~ CS_P* ~ CS_P_+1S!+1* ~ CS_P_+1S!+1!0* ~ CS_P_+1SJ*
ryō (両; 'liǎng ~ pair of objects ~ set of clothes ~ suit of armor')	/ɾjóR/	han	P	CSL_+1* ~ CS_P* ~ CS_P_+1S!+1* ~ CS_P_+1S!+1!0* ~ CS_P_+1SJ*
ryō (両; 'land vehicle')	/ɾjóR/	1; 2; 3; 5; 6; 8; 10; 11; 12; 13; 16; 18; 20; 100: SJ; 4; 14: (jū) yon; 7; 17: (jū) nana; 9; 19: (jū) kyū; nan	P	CS_P
ryō (両; 'land vehicle')	/ɾjóR/	15: /ʑɯ́R ɡo-ɾjoR ~ ʑɯ́R | ɡó-ɾjoR/	XP	CS_P
rin (輪; 'wheel ~ flower')		1; 2; 3; 5; 6; 8; 10; 11; 12; 13; 16; 18; 20: SJ; 4; nan: N; 7; 17: (jū) {nana;shichi}; 9; 19: (jū) kyū; 14: jū yon	P	CS_P
rin (輪; 'wheel ~ flower')		14; 15: /ʑɯ́R {jo;ɡo}-ɾiN ~ ʑɯ́R | {jó;ɡó}-ɾiN/	XP	CS_P
rin (輪; 'wheel ~ flower')		han	D	CS_P
rukusu (ルクス; 'lux')	/ɾɯ́kɯ̥sɯ/	1; 2; 3; 5; 6; 8; 10; 11; 12; 13; 15; 16; 18; 20: SJ; 4; 14: (jū) yon; 7; 17: (jū) nana; 9; 19: (jū) kyū; nan	+1	CSL_+1
rēn (レーン; 'lane')	/ɾéRN/	1; 2; 3; 5; 6; 8; 10; 11; 12; 13; 15; 16; 18; 20: SJ; 4; 14: (jū) yon; 7; 17: (jū) nana; 9; 19: (jū) kyū; nan	+1	CSL_+1
retsu (列; 'row ~ queue')	/ɾétsɯ/	1: SJ	P ~ −1	CS_P*
retsu (列; 'row ~ queue')	/ɾétsɯ/	2; 3; 5; 6; 8; 10; 11; 12; 13; 16; 18; 20: SJ; 4; 14: (jū) yon; 7; 17: (jū) nana; 9; 19: (jū) kyū; nan	P	CS_P*
retsu (列; 'row ~ queue')	/ɾétsɯ/	15: /ʑɯ́R ɡo-ɾetsɯ ~ ʑɯ́R | ɡó-ɾetsɯ/	XP	CS_P*
ren (連; 'string of items')	/ɾéN/	1; 2; 3; 5; 6; 8; 10; 11; 12; 13; 16; 18; 20: SJ; 4; 14: (jū) yon; 7; 17: (jū) nana; 9; 19: (jū) kyū; nan	P ~ D	CS_P* ~ CSL_D* ~ CS_D_PnJ* ~ CS_D_PJnJ*
ren (連; 'string of items')	/ɾéN/	15: /{ʑɯ́R;ʑɯR} ɡo-ɾeN ~ ʑɯ́R | ɡó-ɾeN/	XP ~ D	CS_P* ~ CSL_D* ~ CS_D_PnJ* ~ CS_D_PJnJ*
wa (羽; 'bird ~ leporid')		1; 11: /(ʑɯR) icɕí-wa → (ʑɯR) íQ-pa/; 2; 5; 12: SJ; 3; 13: /(ʑɯR) sáN-wa → (ʑɯR) sáN-ba/; 4; 14: /(ʑɯR) jóN-wa → (ʑɯR) jóN-ba/; 6; 16: /(ʑɯR) ɾokɯ́-wa → (ʑɯR) ɾóQ-pa/; 7; 17: (jū) {nana;shichi}; 8; 18: /(ʑɯR) hacɕí-wa → (ʑɯR) háQ-pa/; 9; 19: (jū) kyū; 10; 20; 30; 40; 50; 60; 70; 80; 90: /({ni;saN;joN;ɡo;ɾokɯ;nana;hacɕi;kjɯR}-)ʑɯ́R-wa → ({ni;saN;joN;ɡo;ɾokɯ;nana;hacɕi;kjɯR}-){ʑíQ;ʑɯ́Q}-pa/; 100: /hjakɯ́-wa → hjáQ-pa/; 1,000: /séN-ba/; nan: /náN-wa → náN-ba/	P	CS_P
wa (羽; 'bird ~ leporid')		15: /ʑɯ́R ɡo-wa ~ ʑɯ́R | ɡó-wa/	XP	CS_P
wa (羽; 'bird ~ leporid')		10,000: /icɕi-maN-ba/	D	CS_P
wa (把; 'bundle ~ sheaf')		1; 2; 3; 5; 6; 8; 11; 12; 13; 16; 18: SJ; 4; 14: (jū) yon; 7; 17: (jū) nana; 9; 19: (jū) kyū; 10; 20: /(ni-){ʑíQ;ʑɯ́Q}-pa/; nan	P	CS_P
wa (把; 'bundle ~ sheaf')		15: /ʑɯ́R ɡo-wa ~ ʑɯ́R | ɡó-wa/	XP	CS_P
wa (話; 'tale ~ chapter')		1; 2; 3; 5; 6; 8; 10; 11; 12; 13; 16; 18; 20: SJ; 4; 14: (jū) yon; 7; 17: (jū) nana; 9; 19: (jū) kyū; nan	P	CS_P
wa (話; 'tale ~ chapter')		15: /ʑɯ́R ɡo-wa ~ ʑɯ́R | ɡó-wa/	XP	CS_P
waku (枠; 'frame')	/wakɯ́/	1; 2; nan: N; 3; 5; 6; 8; 10; 11; 12; 13; 16; 18; 20: SJ; 4; 14: (jū) yon; 7; 17: (jū) nana; 9; 19: (jū) kyū	P	CS_P
waku (枠; 'frame')	/wakɯ́/	15: /ʑɯ́R ɡo-wakɯ ~ ʑɯ́R | ɡó-wakɯ/	XP	CS_P
waku (枠; 'starting gate')	/wakɯ́/	1; 2: SJ	D	
waku (枠; 'starting gate')	/wakɯ́/	3; 5; 6; 8; 10; 11; 12; 13; 16; 18; 20: SJ; 4; 14: (jū) yon; 7; 17: (jū) nana; 9; 19: (jū) kyū; nan	P	
waku (枠; 'starting gate')	/wakɯ́/	15: /ʑɯ́R ɡo-wakɯ ~ ʑɯ́R | ɡó-wakɯ/	XP	
watto (ワット; 'watt')	/wáQto/	1; 2; 3; 5; 6; 8; 10; 11; 12; 13; 15; 16; 18; 20: SJ; 4; 14: (jū) yon; 7; 17: (jū) nana; 9; 19: (jū) kyū; nan	+1	CSL_+1
wari (割; 'tenth')	/waɾi/	1; 2; 3; 5; 6; 8; 10: SJ; 4: yon; 7: N ~ SJ; 9: kyū; nan	P	CS_P
wan (椀; 'bowl of food/drink')	/waN/	1; 2; 3; 7: N; 4: yo; 5; 6; 8; 10: SJ; 9: kyū	P	CS_P

==== Fractions ====
The accentuation of a fraction concerns the last numeral of the denominator, bun (分; /bɯ́N/) and the particle no, which form together an unaccented phrase, and are then followed by the number for the numerator with its own accent. Only the last numeral of the numerator forms the unaccented phrase, and anything before it connects to it loosely as usual.

- 1/2: /ni-bɯN no (|) icɕí/
- 1/3: /saN-bɯN no (|) icɕí/
- 1/10: /ʑɯR-bɯN no (|) icɕí/
- 1/295: /ni-hjakɯ kjɯ́R-ʑɯR | ɡo-bɯN no (|) icɕí/

== Affixes ==
=== Prefixes ===
Purasu (プラス; /pɯɾasɯ ~ pɯ́ɾasɯ/ 'plus') and mainasu (マイナス; /mainasɯ/ 'minus') connect loosely to a number to express positivity and negativity:

- purasu roku (プラス六; /pɯɾasɯ (|) ɾokɯ́/ 'plus six'), purasu jū san (プラス十三; /pɯɾasɯ (|) ʑɯ́R saN/ 'plus thirteen'), etc.
- mainasu san (マイナス三; /mainasɯ̥ (|) saN/ 'minus three'), mainasu nihyaku sanjū ichi (マイナス二百三十一; /mainasɯ (|) ni-hjakɯ sáN-ʑɯR icɕi ~ mainasɯ (|) ni-hjakɯ sáN-ʑɯR | icɕí/ 'minus two hundred thirty one'), etc.

Dai (第; /dái/ '‑th') connects loosely to a Sino-Japanese numeral, yon and nana to unambiguously express ordinality:

- dai ichi (第一; /dái icɕi/ 'the first'), dai ni (第二; /dái ni ~ dai ni/ 'the second'), dai san (第三; /dái san/ 'the third'), dai yon ~ dai shi (第四; /dái yon ~ dái ɕi/ 'the fourth'), dai go (第五; /dái ɡo/ 'the fifth'), dai roku (第六; /dái ɾokɯ/ 'the fifth'), etc.
- dai issen (第一戦; /dái (|) iQ-seN/ 'the first match'), dai nisen (第二戦; /dái (|) ni-seN/ 'the second match'), dai sansen (第三戦; /dái (|) san-seN/ 'the third match') etc.
- dai ichinichi (第一日; /dái | icɕi-nicɕí/ 'the first day'), dai ninichi (第二日; /dái | ni-nicɕí/ 'the second day'), dai sannichi (第三日; /dái | sáN-nicɕi/ 'the third day'), etc.
- dai ikkaN (第一巻; /dái | iQ-káN/ 'the first volume'), dai nikan (第二巻; /dái | ni-káN/ 'the second volume'), dai sankan (第三巻; /dái | saN-káN/ 'the third volume'), etc.

Maki (巻; /máki/ 'volume') expresses ordinal book volumes: maki ichi (巻一; /máki icɕi ~ máki | icɕí/ 'volume one'), maki ni (巻二; /máki ni ~ máki | ní/ 'volume two'), maki san (巻三; /máki̥ (|) saN/ 'volume three'), etc.

Kitaru (来たる; /ki̥táɾɯ/ 'that comes'), yoku (翌; /jokɯ ~ jókɯ/) and myō (明; /mjóR ~ mjoR/) express a future point in time or period of time: kitaru (来たる三日; /ki̥táɾɯ (|) miQ-ka/ 'the next third'), yoku tōka (翌十日; /{jokɯ̥ ~ jókɯ̥} (|) toR-ka/ 'the next tenth'), myō itsuka (明五日; /{mjóR ~ mjoR} (|) itsɯ̥-ka/ 'the next fifth'), etc.

Saru (去る; /sáɾɯ/ 'that leaves') and saku (昨; /sakɯ ~ sákɯ/) express a past point in time or period of time: kitaru (去る十日; /sáɾɯ (|) toR-ka/ 'the last tenth'), saku jūninichi (昨十二日; /sakɯ (|) ʑɯR-ni-nicɕí ~ sákɯ ʑɯR-ni-nicɕi ~ sákɯ | ʑɯR-ni-nicɕí/ 'the last twelfth'), etc.

Shō (正; /ɕóR/ 'exactly') expresses an exact time of the day: shō hachiji (正八時; /ɕóR | hacɕí-ʑi/ 'eight sharp'), etc.

Kin (金; /kíN/ 'money') expresses an amount of money and prevents number manipulation in writing (see also Japanese numerals § Formal numbers): kin gojūen (金五拾圓; /kíN | ɡo-ʑɯ́R-eN/ 'fifty yen'), kin ichiman'en nari (金壱萬圓也; /kíN | icɕi-maN-eN nári/ 'ten thousand yen'), etc.

Hō (方; /hóR/ 'square') expresses the dimension of a square object or area: hō sanzun (方三寸; /hóR | sáN-zɯN/ 'three square cùn'), hō niken (方二間; /hóR | ní-keN/ 'two square ken'), hō jūri (方十里; /hóR | ʑɯ́R-ɾi/ 'ten square lǐ'), etc.

=== Suffixes ===
==== Short suffixes ====
‑me (目; /mé/ '‑th') expresses ordinality and is final-accented:

- futsukame (二日目; /ɸɯ̥tsɯ-ka-mé/ 'the second day'), mikkame (三日目; /miQ-ka-mé/ 'the third day'), yokkame (四日目; /joQ-ka-mé/ 'the fourth day'), jū yokkame (十四日目; /ʑɯR joQ-ka-mé/ 'the fourteenth day'), etc.
- ichinichime (一日目; /icɕi-nicɕi-mé/ 'the first day'), jū ninichime (十二日目; /ʑɯR ni-nicɕi-mé/ 'the twelfth day'), jū sannichime (十三日目; /ʑɯR saN-nicɕi-mé/ 'the thirteenth day'), jū yonnichime (十四日目; /ʑɯR joN-nicɕi-mé/ 'the fourteenth day'), etc.
- hachibanme (八番目; /hacɕi-baN-mé/ 'number eight'), sanbaime (三杯目; /saN-bai-mé/ 'the third cup'), shichinenme (七年目; /ɕi̥cɕi-neN-mé/ 'the seventh year'), jūmanninme (十万人目; /ʑɯR-maN-niN-mé/ 'the one hundred thousandth person'), etc.

‑sugi (過ぎ; /sɯɡí/ 'exceeding') expresses a point in time slightly past the specified point, and is final-accented: gojisugi (五時過ぎ; /ɡo-ʑi-sɯɡí/ 'a little past five'), jūji gofunsugi (十時五分過ぎ; /ʑɯ́R-ʑi | ɡo-ɸɯN-sɯɡí/ 'a little past five past ten'), etc.

‑buri (振り) expresses equivalence in scope or size, or the amount of time that has elapsed since something last happened, and is either deaccenting or final-accented:

- gokenburi (五軒振り; /ɡo-keN-bɯɾi ~ ɡo-keN-bɯɾí/ 'the size of five houses'), futariburi (二人振り; /ɸɯ̥ta-ɾi-bɯɾi ~ ɸɯ̥ta-ɾi-bɯɾí/ 'the size of two people'), gochisō wa sanninburi aru (御馳走は三人振りある; /ɡocɕi̥soR wa saN-niN-bɯɾi áɾɯ/ 'there is enough food for three people'), etc.
- jūnenburi de kyōdai ni au (十年振りで兄弟に会う; /ʑɯR-neN-bɯɾi de kjóRdai ni | áɯ/ 'meets one's siblings for the first time in five years'), tōkaburi de furo ni hairu (十日振りで風呂に入る; /toR-ka-bɯɾi de ɸɯɾó ni | háiɾɯ/ 'takes a bath for the first time in ten days'), etc.

‑jiki (敷き) expresses the number of tatami laid out and is deaccenting: hyakujōjiki no ōhiroma (百畳敷きの大広間; /hjakɯ-ʑoR-ʑiki no oRhíɾoma/ 'a hundred-tatami hall'), chashitsu wa futsū nanjōjiki desu ka (茶室は普通何畳敷きですか; /cɕaɕi̥tsɯ wa ɸɯ̥tsɯR naN-ʑoR-ʑiki désɯ̥ ka/ 'how many tatami are there usually in a room for tea ceremony?'), etc.

‑mae (前; /máe/) is:

- Initial-accented if it means 'before' or 'ago': yonjūmae (四十前; /joN-ʑɯR-máe/ 'under forty'), jūji sanpunmae (十時三分前; /ʑɯ́R-ʑi | saN-pɯN-máe/ 'three to/before ten'), futsukamae (二日前; /ɸɯ̥tsɯ-ka-máe/ 'two days ago'), isshūkanmae (一週間前; /iQ-ɕɯRkaN-máe/ 'one week ago'), ikkagetsumae (一ヶ月前; /iQ-kaɡetsɯ-máe/ 'one month ago'), etc.
- Deaccenting if it means 'allotment/portion/serving': ichininmae ~ hitorimae (一人前; /icɕi-niN-mae ~ hi̥to-ɾi-mae/ 'one person's allotment/portion/serving'), ikkenmae (一軒前; /iQ-keN-mae/ 'one house's allotment for bearing responsibilities for the entire village'), etc.

‑bun (分; /bɯ́N/ 'portion') expresses an amount intended for a specified number of people or things, and is deaccenting: yoninbun (四人分; /jo-niN-bɯN/ 'four people's servings'), oyatsu gojūenbun (お八つ五十円分; /ojátsɯ ɡo-ʑɯR-eN-bɯN/ 'five hundred yen's worth of snacks'), ichiman'enbun no gifuto kādo (一万円分のギフトカード; /icɕi-maN-eN-bɯN no ɡiɸɯ̥to káRdo/ 'a ten-thousand-yen gift card'), mikkabun no kusuri (三日分の薬; /miQ-ka-bɯN no kɯ̥sɯɾi/ 'four people's servings'), sūkagetsu no shokuryō (数ヶ月分の食料; /sɯR-kaɡetsɯ-bɯN no ɕokɯ́ɾjoR/ 'several months' food supply'), etc. It is not to be confused with ‑bun which refers to an amount relative to another amount (for example in percentage), which is preaccenting: zōkabun (増加分; /zoRká-bɯN/ 'an increment'), shibōbun (脂肪分; /ɕibóR-bɯN/ 'fat content'), etc.

‑zuke (付け) is attached to a date to express when something is dated or the date on which something happens, and is deaccenting: kongetsu itsukazuke no tegami (今月五日付けの手紙; /koNɡetsɯ itsɯ̥-ka-zɯke no teɡami/ 'a letter dated the fifth of this month'), hon kisoku wa jūgatsu hatsukazuke o motte shikō sareta (本規則は十月二十日付けをもって施行された; /hóN | ki̥sókɯ wa | ʑɯRɡatsɯ̥ hatsɯ̥-ka-zɯke o móQte ɕi̥koR saɾeta/ 'this rule took effect on the twentieth of October'), etc.

‑zutsu (宛) expresses, adverbially, the same amount handled every time, or the same amount allotted to every member of a group, and is initial-accented or preaccenting:

- Nihon no jinkō wa toshi ni nanajūmanzutsu fueru (日本の人口は年に七十万ずつ増える; /nihoN no ʑiNkoR wa toɕí ni | {nana-ʑɯR-maN-zɯ́tsɯ ~ nana-ʑɯR-máN-zɯtsɯ} | ɸɯéɾɯ/ 'Japan's population increases by seven hundred thousand every year'), etc.
- sanninzutsu yobe (三人ずつ呼べ; /{saN-niN-zɯ́tsɯ ~ saN-níN-zɯtsɯ} | jobé/ 'call three people at a time!'), kanja o hitorizutsu miru (患者を一人ずつ見る; /kaNʑa o {hi̥to-ɾi-zɯ́tsɯ ~ hi̥to-ɾí-zɯtsɯ} | míɾɯ/ 'sees patients one by one'), kakushu o gokozutsu kaō (各種を五個ずつ買おう; /kákɯ̥ɕɯ o | {ɡo-ko-zɯ́tsɯ ~ ɡo-kó-zɯtsɯ} | kaóR/ 'I'll buy five of each type'), isshurui mittsuzuru moraimashō (一種類三つずつ貰いましょう; /iQ-ɕɯ́ɾɯi | {miQ-tsɯ-zɯ́tsɯ ~ miQ-tsɯ́-zɯtsɯ} | moɾaimaɕóR/ 'I'll take three of each type'), kaidan o nidanzutsu noboru (階段を二段ずつ昇る; /kaidaN o {ni-daN-zɯ́tsɯ ~ ni-dáN-zɯtsɯ} noboɾɯ/ 'climbs two stairs at a time'), etc.
- ichikirozutsu fukuro ni ireru (一キロずつ袋に入れる; /{icɕi̥-kiɾo-zɯ́tsɯ ~ icɕi̥-kiɾó-zɯtsɯ} | ɸɯ̥kuɾó ni iɾeɾɯ/ 'puts three kilos in each bag'), ichinichi sankai, ikkai ni sanjōzutsu nomu (一日三回、一回に三錠ずつ飲む; /icɕi-nicɕi̥ saN-kai iQ-kái ni | {saN-ʑoR-zɯ́tsɯ ~ saN-ʑóR-zɯtsɯ} | nómɯ/ 'takes them three times a day, three pills each time'), watashitachi ni nanamaizutsu kādo o kubatta (私たちに七枚ずつカードを配った; /wataɕí̥tacɕi ni | {nana-mai-zɯ́tsɯ ~ nana-mái-zɯtsɯ} | káRdo o | kɯbáQta/ 'he dealt seven cards to each of us'), etc.

‑han (半; /háN/ 'and a half'; yojōhan (四畳半; /jo-ʑóR-haN/ 'four tatami and a half') is an idiomatic exception), ‑kyō (強; /kjóR/ 'a little over') and ‑jaku (弱; /ʑákɯ/ 'a little under') are initial-accented, or form their own separate minor phrases:

- goji han (五時半; /ɡo-ʑi háN ~ ɡó-ʑi | háN/ 'half past five'), tomon han (十文半; /to-mon háN ~ tó-moN | háN/ 'ten mon and a half'), etc.
- sanbyakuen kyō (三百円強; /saN-bjakɯ-eN kjóR ~ saN-bjakɯ́-eN | kjóR ~ sáN-bjakɯ-eN | kjóR/ 'a little over three hundred yen'), sen'en jaku (千円弱; /seN-eN (|) ʑákɯ/ 'a little under a thousand yen'), etc.

‑gata (方; 'approximately') and ‑dota (どた; /dota/ 'exactly') are preaccenting: niwarigata (二割方; /ni-waɾí-ɡata/ 'about two tenths'), nijūendota (二十円どた; /ni-ʑɯR-éN-dota/ 'exactly twenty yen'), etc.

==== Long suffixes ====
Long suffixes can:

- Behave like regular compound heads:
  - shijū + {amari} → shijūamari (四十+{余り}→四十余り; 'forty + {exceeding → over} → over forty'): /ɕi-ʑɯ́R + {amáɾi → amaɾí} → ɕi-ʑɯR-ámaɾi/
  - gojū + {karami} → gojūgarami (五十+{搦み}→五十搦み; 'fifty + {binding → around} → about fifty'): /ɡo-ʑɯ́R + {kaɾámi → kaɾamí} → ɡo-ʑɯR-ɡáɾami/
  - tōka + {kakari} → tōkagakari (十日+{掛かり}→十日掛かり; 'ten days + {being required} → it taking ten days'): /toR-ka + {kakáɾi → kákaɾi} → toR-ka-ɡákaɾi/
  - gojū + yūyo → gojū yūyo (五十+有余→五十有余; 'fifty + excess → over fifty'): /ɡo-ʑɯ́R + jɯ́Rjo → ɡo-ʑɯR jɯ́Rjo/
  - gojū + ijō → gojū ijō (五十+以上→五十以上; 'fifty + or more → fifty or more'): /ɡo-ʑɯ́R + íʑoR → ɡo-ʑɯR íʑoR/
  - sen'en + ika → sen'en ika (千円+以下→千円以下; 'one thousand yen + or less → one thousand yen or less'): /seN-eN + íka → seN-eN íka/
  - {sanjūnin} + kentō → sanjūnin kentō ({三十人}+見当→三十人見当; '{thirty people} + an estimate → about thhirty people'): /{saN-ʑɯ́R-niN ~ sáN-ʑɯR-niN} + keNtóR → saN-ʑɯR-niN kéNtoR/
- Or additionally form their own minor phrases:
  - hyakuen + chokkiri → hyakuen chokkiri (百円+ちょっきり→百円ちょっきり; 'one hundred yen + exactly → exactly one hundred yen'): /hjakɯ-eN + cɕoQkíɾi → hjakɯ-eN (|) cɕoQkíɾi/
  - sen'en + pokkiri → sen'en pokkiri (千円+ぽっきり→千円ぽっきり; 'one thousand yen + exactly → exactly one thousand yen'): /seN-eN + poQkíɾi → seN-eN (|) poQkíɾi/
  - sen'en + kikkari → sen'en kikkari (千円+きっかり→千円きっかり; 'one thousand yen + exactly → exactly one thousand yen'): /seN-eN + ki̥Qkáɾi → seN-eN (|) ki̥Qkáɾi/
  - jūji + kakkiri → {jūji kakkari} (十時+かっきり→{十時かっきり}; 'ten + exactly → {ten sharp}'): /ʑɯ́R-ʑi + kaQkíɾi → {ʑɯR-ʑi kaQkíɾi ~ ʑɯ́R-ʑi | kaQkíɾi}/
  - gojūbyō + furatto → {gojūbyō furatto} (五十秒+フラット→{五十秒フラット}; 'fifty seconds + flat → {fifty seconds flat}'): /ɡo-ʑɯ́R-bjoR + ɸɯɾáQto → {ɡo-ʑɯR-bjoR ɸɯɾáQto ~ ɡo-ʑɯ́R-bjoR | ɸɯɾáQto}/
  - sanjū + {sokosoko} → sanjū sokosoko (三十+{其処其処}→三十其処其処; 'thirty + {around there} → about thirty'): /sáN-ʑɯR + {sokosoko ~ sokósoko} → sáN-ʑɯR | sokosoko/

== Dvandvas ==
Numbers and number–counter sequences can form dvandvas to say something like "one or two (people)."

=== Number + number(–counter) ===
A dvandva of two Sino-Japanese numerals tends to retain the nucleus of the first one:

- ichi + ni → {ichini} (一+二→{一二}; 'one + two → {one or two}'): /icɕí + ní → {icɕí-ni ~ ícɕi-ni}/
- ni + san → nisan (二+三→二三; 'two + three → two or three'): /ní + saN → ní-saN/
- shi + go → shigo (四+五→四五; 'four + five → four or five'): /ɕí + ɡó → ɕí-ɡo/
- shi + gosen → shigosen (四+五千→四五千; 'four + five thousand → four or five thousand'): /ɕí + ɡo-séN → ɕí-ɡo-seN/
- go + roku → goroku (五+六→五六; 'five + six → five or six'): /ɡó + ɾokɯ́ → ɡó-ɾokɯ/
- go + rokujū → gorokujū (五+六十→五六十; 'five + sixty → fifty or sixty'): /ɡó + ɾokɯ-ʑɯ́R → ɡó-ɾokɯ-ʑɯR/
- gojū + {go + roku → goroku} → gojū goroku (五十+{五+六→五六}→五十五六; 'fifty + {five + six → five or six} → fifty five or six'): /ɡo-ʑɯ́R + {ɡó + ɾokɯ́ → ɡó-ɾokɯ} → ɡo-ʑɯR (|) ɡó-ɾokɯ/
- nijū + {go + roku → goroku} → nijū goroku (二十+{五+六→五六}→二十五六; 'twenty + {five + six → five or six} → twenty five or six'): /ní-ʑɯR + {ɡó + ɾokɯ́ → ɡó-ɾokɯ} → ní-ʑɯR | ɡó-ɾokɯ/
- shichi + hachi → shichihachi (七+八→七八; 'seven + eight → seven or eight'): /ɕi̥cɕí + hacɕí → ɕi̥cɕí-hacɕi/
- shichi + happyaku → shichihappyaku (七+八百→七八百; 'seven + eight hundred → seven or eight hundred'): /ɕi̥cɕí + haQ-pjakɯ́ → ɕi̥cɕí-haQ-pjakɯ/
- sanjū + {shichi + hachi → shichihachi} → sanjū shichihachi (三十+{七+八→七八}→三十七八; 'thirty + {seven + eight → seven or eight} → thirty seven or eight'): /sáN-ʑɯR + {ɕi̥cɕí + hacɕí → ɕi̥cɕí-hacɕi} → sáN-ʑɯR | ɕi̥cɕí-hacɕi/
- hachi + ku → hakku (八+九→八九; 'eight + nine → eight or nine'): /hacɕí + kɯ́ → háQ-kɯ/
- ku → kuku (九→九九; 'nine → nine by nine → a multiplication table'): /kɯ́ → kɯ̥́-kɯ → kɯ̥-kɯ́/

English dvandvas behave like modifier–head compounds:

- tsū + surī → tsū surī (ツー+スリー→ツースリー; 'two + three → two or three'): /tsɯ́R + sɯɾíR → tsɯR sɯɾíR/

A dvandva of a numeral and a number–counter sequence tends to be unaccented: nisankai (二三回; /ni-saN-kai/ 'two or three times'), ichiniken (一二軒; /icɕi-ni-keN/ 'one or two houses'), shigosai (四五歳; /ɕi-ɡo-sai/ 'four or five years old'), gorokusai (五六歳; /ɡo-ɾokɯ̥-sai/ 'five or six years old'), sanyonin (三四人; /saN-jo-niN/ 'three or four people'), (八九人; /haQ-kɯ-niN/ 'eight or nine people'), goroppai (五六杯; /ɡo-ɾoQ-pai/ 'five or six cups'), shichihappon (七八本; /ɕi̥cɕi-haQ-poN/ 'seven or eight long and thin things'), shichihachimai (七八枚; /ɕi̥cɕi-hacɕi-mai/ 'seven or eight thin and flat things'), etc.

- But a dvandva with ‑nichi (日; /nícɕi/ 'day') may also retain the first numeral's nucleus or the number–counter sequence's medial nucleus: nisannichi → nisanchi (二三日; /{ní-saN-nicɕi → ní-saN-cɕi} ~ {ni-sáN-nicɕi → ni-sáN-cɕi}/ 'two or three days'), shigonichi (四五日; /ɕí-ɡo-nicɕi ~ ɕi-ɡó-nicɕi ~ ɕi-ɡo-nicɕi/ 'four or five days'), gorokunichi (五六日; /ɡó-ɾokɯ-nicɕi ~ ɡo-ɾokɯ-nicɕi/ 'five or six days'), etc.
- An example with ‑tsu: nanayatsu (七八つ; /nána-jatsɯ/ 'seven or eight things')

=== Number–counter + number–counter ===
A dvandva of two number–counter sequences tends to retain the first one's nucleus or be separable:

- futatsu + mi(t)tsu → futatsu mi(t)tsu (二つ+三つ→二つ三つ; 'two things + three things → two or three things'): /ɸɯ̥ta-tsɯ́ + mi(Q)-tsɯ́ → ɸɯ̥ta-tsɯ́ mi(Q)-tsɯ/
- itsutsu + mutsu → itsutsu mutsu (五つ+六つ→五つ六つ; 'five things + six things → five or six things'): /itsɯ́-tsɯ + mɯ-tsɯ́ → itsɯ́-tsɯ mɯ-tsɯ/
- hitotsu + futatsu → hitotsu futatsu (一つ+二つ→一つ二つ; 'one thing + two things → one or two things'): /hi̥tó-tsɯ + ɸɯ̥ta-tsɯ́ → hi̥tó-tsɯ ɸɯ̥ta-tsɯ/
- hitori + futari → hitori futari (一人+二人→一人二人; 'one person + two people → one or two people'): /hi̥tó-ɾi + ɸɯ̥ta-ɾí → hi̥tó-ɾi ɸɯ̥ta-ɾi/
- jūnin + toiro → jūnin toiro (十人+十色→十人十色; 'ten people + ten colors → ten people, ten colors → to each their own'): /ʑɯ́R-niN + tó-iɾo → ʑɯ́R-niN | tó-iɾo ~ ʑɯ́R-niN to-iɾo/
- nishō + sanpai → nishō sanpai (二勝+三敗→二勝三敗; 'two wins + three losses → two wins, three losses'): /ni-ɕoR + saN-pai → ni-ɕoR saN-pai/

Some number–counter sequences lose their nucleus as the first component:

- nido + sando → nido sando (二度+三度→二度三度; 'twice + thrice → twice or thrice'): /ni-dó + sáN-do → ni-do sáN-do/
- shikaku + shimen → shikaku shimen (四角+四面→四角四面; 'four angles + four faces → a perfect square → prim and proper'): /ɕi̥-kakɯ́ + ɕí-meN → ɕi̥-kakɯ ɕí-meN/

A dvandva with ‑ka may be accented on the first component's last mora:

- futsuka + mikka → futsuka mikka (二日+三日→二日三日; 'two days + three days → two or three days'): /ɸɯ̥tsɯ-ka + miQ-ka → ɸɯ̥tsɯ-ká miQ-ka/
- mikka + yokka → mikka yokka (三日+四日→三日四日; 'three days + four days → three or four days'): /miQ-ka + joQ-ka → miQ-ká joQ-ka/

Some proverbial dvandvas behave like modifier–head compounds:

- shichibu + sanbu → shichibu sanbu (七分+三分→七分三分; 'seven tenths + three tenths → seven to three'): /ɕi̥cɕí-bɯ + sáN-bɯ → ɕi̥cɕi-bɯ sáN-bɯ/
- ichibu + ichirin → ichibu ichirin (一分+一厘→一分一厘; 'one bu + one rin → a minuscule amount'): /icɕí-bɯ + icɕí-ɾiN → icɕi-bɯ icɕí-ɾiN/
- kusun + gobu → kusun gobu (九寸+五分→九寸五分; 'nine sun + five bu → a nine-sun and five-bu-long knife'): /kɯ̥-sɯ́N + ɡó-bɯ → kɯ̥-sɯN ɡó-bɯ/
- {gojippo ~ gojuppo} + hyappo → {gojippo hyappo ~ gojuppo hyappo} ({五十歩}+百歩→{五十歩百歩}; '{fifty steps} + one hundred steps → the same difference'): /{ɡo-ʑíQ-po ~ ɡo-ʑɯ́Q-po} + hjáQ-po → {ɡo-ʑiQ-po hjáQ-po ~ ɡo-ʑɯQ-po hjáQ-po}/
- {ippai} → ippai ippai ({一杯}→一杯一杯; '{one cup → one full cupful → a full amount} → the absolute limit'): /{íQ-pai} → iQ-pai íQ-pai/

== Bibliography ==
- Akinaga, Kazue (20 December 1998) [25 April 1998]. 共通語のアクセント. In NHK Broadcasting Culture Research Institute (ed.). NHK日本語発音アクセント辞典 新版 (in Japanese) (5th ed.). Shibuya, Tokyo: NHK Publishing. pp. 174–221. ISBN 4-14-011112-7.
- Hirayama, Teruo, ed. (15 September 2010) [30 June 1960]. 全国アクセント辞典 (in Japanese) (31st ed.). Chiyoda, Tokyo: Tokyodo Shuppan. ISBN 978-4-490-10023-5.
- Kindaichi, Haruhiko; Akinaga, Kazue, eds. (1 April 2025) [10 April 2014]. 新明解日本語アクセント辞典 (in Japanese) (2nd ed.). Chiyoda, Tokyo: Sanseido. ISBN 978-4-385-13468-0.
- NHK Broadcasting Culture Research Institute, ed. (20 December 1998) [25 April 1998]. NHK日本語発音アクセント辞典 新版 (in Japanese) (5th ed.). Shibuya, Tokyo: NHK Publishing. ISBN 4-14-011112-7.
- NHK Broadcasting Culture Research Institute, ed. (20 June 2025) [25 May 2016]. NHK日本語発音アクセント新辞典 (in Japanese) (15th ed.). Shibuya, Tokyo: NHK Publishing. ISBN 978-4-14-011345-5.
- Sakurai, Shigeharu; Akinaga, Kazue (20 December 1998) [25 April 1998]. 数詞・助数詞の発音とアクセント. In NHK Broadcasting Culture Research Institute (ed.). NHK日本語発音アクセント辞典 新版 (in Japanese) (5th ed.). Shibuya, Tokyo: NHK Publishing. pp. 223–226. ISBN 4-14-011112-7.
- Yamashita, Yōko; Fujii, Madoka (1 June 2025). 語の読み方（語形）について数字の読み方～小数の読み方～. 第1477回放送用語委員会（東京）2025年2月28日. 放送用語委員会: 108–120.
