= Japanese pitch accent =

Japanese language feature

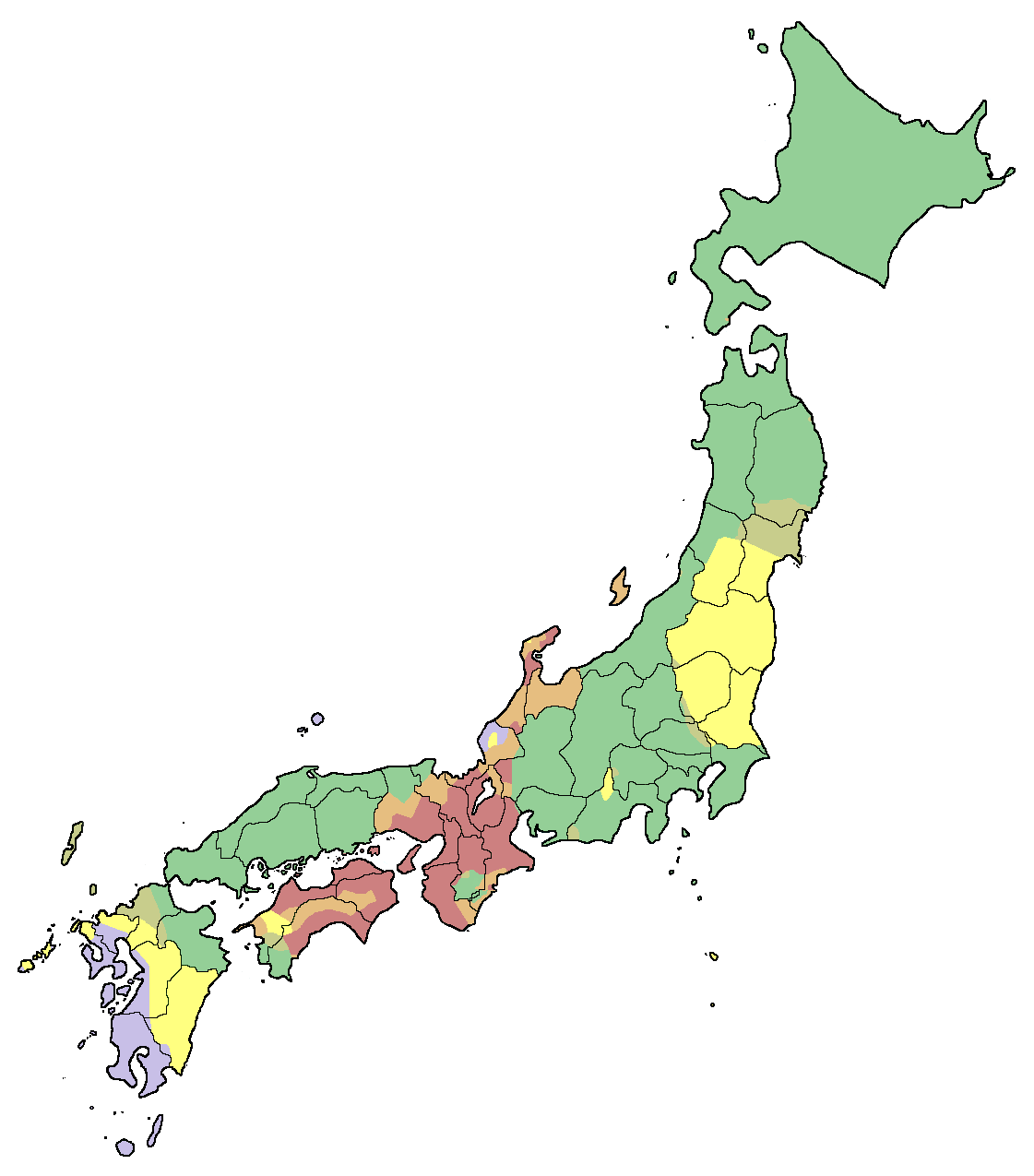
Japanese pitch-accent types Keihan type (pitch drop plus tone) Tokyo type (variable pitch drop) N-kei (1-3 pattern) type (fixed pitch drop) No accent intermediate (Tokyo–Keihan) intermediate (Tokyo–none)

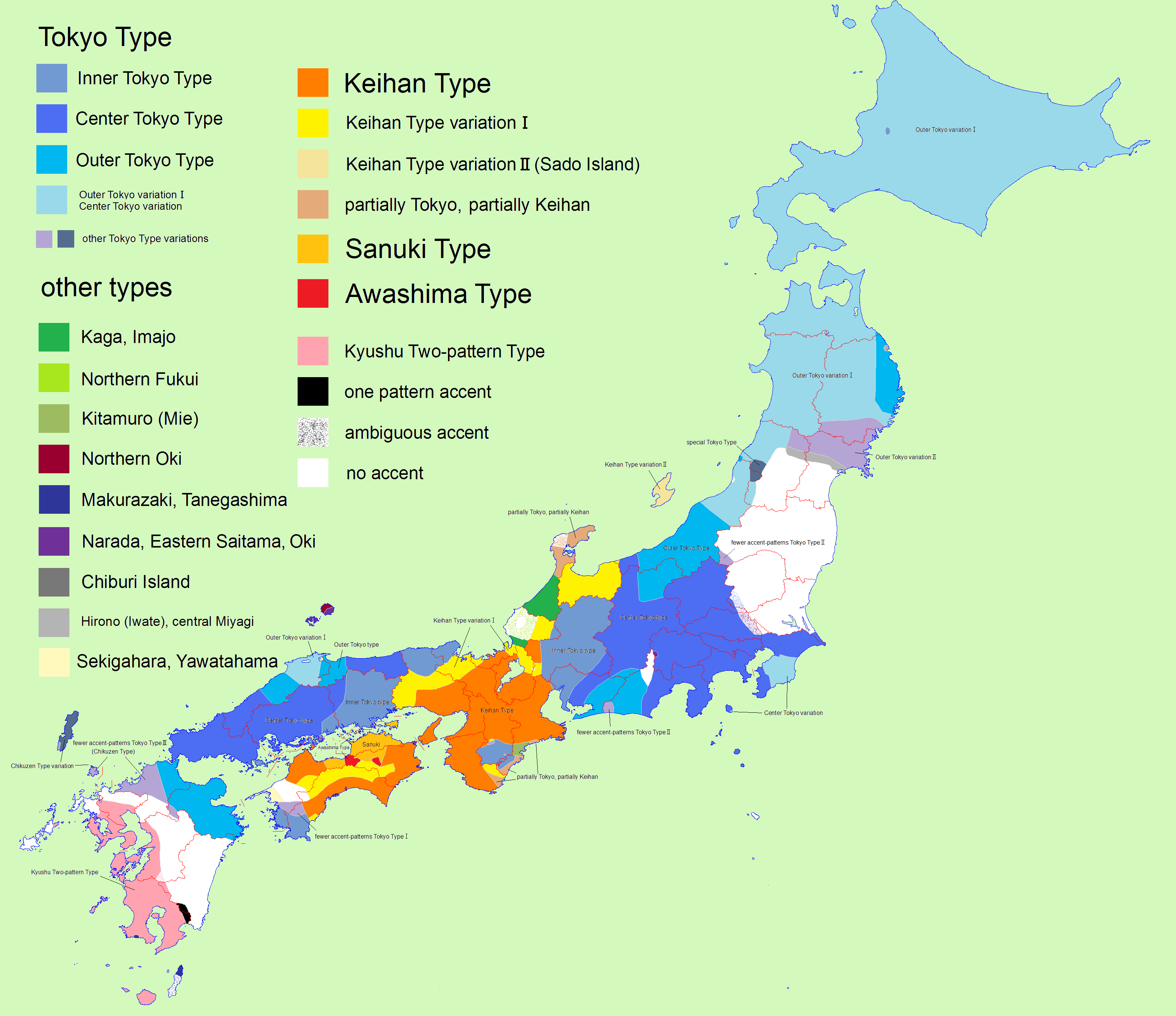
Pitch-accent systems of Japanese. Blues: Tokyo type. Yellow-orange: Kyoto–Osaka (Keihan) type. Pink: Two-pattern accent. White: No accent. Speckled areas are ambiguous.

Japanese pitch accent is an important part of the prosody of Japanese, which involves making a certain melody with a series of "high" and "low" pitches, or tones, on a given utterance. Pitch accent is contrastive and can help distinguish words in Japanese, similarly to stress accent in English and contour tones in Chinese. The most studied accent system is of the Tokyo dialect, which differs from other systems such as Kansai or Kyushu.

Reading of the first two paragraphs of the chapter 1 of Botchan in the Tokyo accent

Reading of the same part of Botchan in the Kansai accent

== Tokyo accent ==
This section deals principally with the accent of modern standard Japanese, the Yamanote variety of the Tokyo dialect.

=== Accentual falls and lowering nuclei ===
In contrast to stress accent (強弱アクセント・強さアクセント, kyōjaku akusento/tsuyosa akusento; lit. 'strong-and-weak accent/strength accent') in English, Japanese is said to have pitch accent (高低アクセント・高さアクセント, kōtei akusento/takasa akusento; lit. 'high-and-low accent/height accent'). This means that Japanese speakers make primary use of pitch to distinguish words, while English speakers also make use of length, articulatory strength and vowel quality. The fact that Japanese relies solely on pitch for lexical contrast correlates with the great variety in pitch accent across Japanese dialects; a stress-accent language like English shows much less variety as the same words tend to have the same accent across English dialects.

Japanese pitch accent is characterized as "a steep drop from a relatively high pitch to a relatively low pitch", henceforth an "accentual fall" or "accentual drop". In Tokyo Japanese, it is the presence or absence, as well as the exact location, of the accentual fall within an utterance that are lexically contrastive, not the exact pitch contour. This sets Japanese apart as a "pitch-accent" language, as opposed to a "tone" language such as Mandarin, where it is the pitch contour of a word that is contrastive.

The mora at the start of an accentual fall can be called "accented", or an "accent nucleus" or "accent kernel" (アクセント核, akusentokaku). It carries a high tone, is followed by a mora with a low tone, and thus can be termed the "lowering nucleus/kernel" (下げ核, sagekaku).

=== Accent patterns ===
Tokyo Japanese belongs to a group of dialects with n+1-pattern accent (n+1型アクセント). This means that a Tokyo noun phrase with n morae has, theoretically, n possible locations for the nucleus, as well as not having a nucleus at all, hence n+1 possible patterns in total; however, nouns with five or more morae do not have all n+1 possibilities, but at most four. Other dialects may only have 2- (such as in Kagoshima) or 3-pattern (such as in Goka) accent.

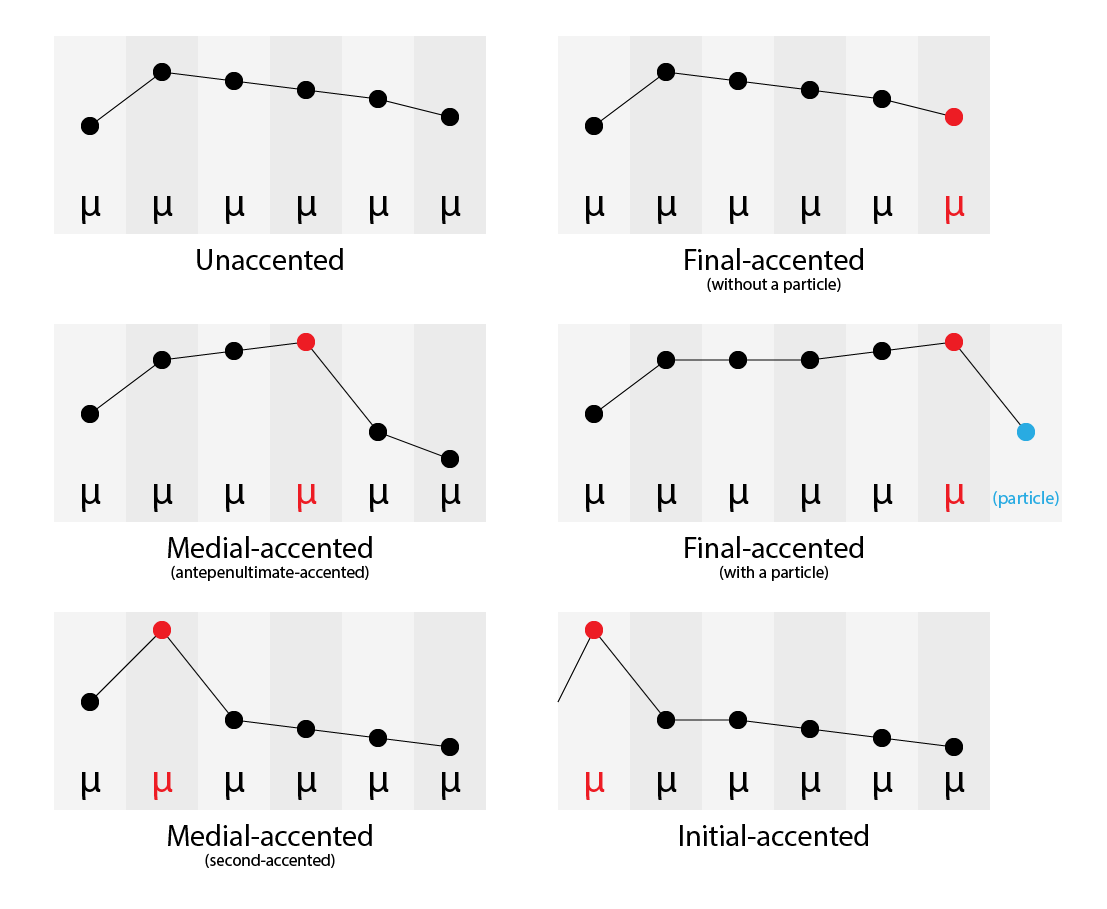

The n+1 possibilities of accent patterns (アクセント型, akusentogata) can be classified as follows (in the diagrams, the nuclei are marked in red):

- Unaccented/Atonic (平板式・平板型・無核型, heibanshiki/heibangata/mukakugata; lit. 'flat style/flat pattern/unnucleated pattern'): The phrase in question has no nucleus. An unaccented phrase can be of any length.
- Accented/Tonic (起伏式・起伏型・有核型, kifukushiki/kifukugata/yūkakugata; lit. 'up-and-down style/up-and-down pattern/nucleated pattern'): The phrase has exactly one nucleus which is the first mora, the last mora, or any mora between them.
  - Initial-accented (頭高型, atamadakagata; lit. 'high-head pattern'): The nucleus is the first mora. An initial-accented phrase can be of any length. An initial-accented unimoraic phrase is accentually indistinguishable from an unaccented unimoraic phrase, and the accent in this particular case is only realized before a particle or auxiliary.
  - Medial-/Internal-accented (中高型, nakadakagata; lit. 'high-middle pattern'): The nucleus is neither the first nor last mora. Thus, a medial-accented phrase must necessarily be trimoraic or longer.
  - Final-accented (尾高型, odakagata; lit. 'high-tail pattern'): The nucleus is the last mora, but not simultaneously the first mora in a unimoraic phrase which, if accented, would be initial-accented instead. Thus, a final-accented phrase must necessarily be bimoraic or longer; it is accentually indistinguishable from an unaccented phrase, and the accent is only realized before a particle or auxiliary. Final accent is the least productive pattern in nucleus-based dialects such as Tokyo-style and Kyoto–Osaka-style dialects, and it is unlikely to occur in newer words.

The actual pitch pattern of a final-accented phrase is generally considered indistinguishable from that of an unaccented phrase. The "final accent" of a word only surfaces as "medial accent" when it is followed by a particle or auxiliary, which is also the only time when a final-accented word is indeed distinct from an unaccented one. However, there are indeed some speakers who do make distinctions between no accent and final accent, for example by raising the overall pitch contour on the final-accented hana (花; /haná/ 'a flower') higher than on the unaccented hana (鼻; /hana/ 'a nose'). In one study, one college-educated female Tokyo speaker was able to not only produce a consistent, better-than-chance distinction between no accent and final accent, but to also perceive it consistently when she was listening to her own recordings, something none of the other subjects could do.

=== The phonetic accent contour ===
A pitch track for the accented yamanobori (山登り; 'mountain climbing'), drawn in Praat, based on a recording of a female speaker from the companion website of Kōri (2024). The initial rise from the first mora /ja/ to the second mora /ma/ spans almost the entire duration /ma/, and the accentual fall from /no/ to /bo/ spans the entire duration of /bo/.

The actual pitch pattern is not simply a fluctuation between some "high" and "low" tones, but is a phonetically complex contour. In an accented phrase, the basic contour:

1. Starts from a relatively low pitch on the first mora;
2. Rises sharply to a relatively high pitch on the second mora: the vocal folds may take some time, up to the entire duration of the second or even third mora, to complete this rise; voiceless consonants have no pitch, but they may cause the pitch after them to start slightly higher; nonetheless, the second mora is still perceived as "high;"
3. Continues to rise higher to the highest pitch on the nuclear mora: the "high" on the nucleus is actually higher than the "high" on the second mora;
4. Falls sharply to a very low pitch on the postnuclear mora: this fall may also span the entire duration of the postnuclear mora; nonetheless, the postnuclear mora is still perceived as "low;"
5. Declines further to the last mora.

In contrast, in an unaccented phrase, the basic contour:

1. Starts from a relatively low pitch on the first mora;
2. Rises sharply to a relatively high pitch on the second mora;
3. Declines gradually towards a relatively low pitch on the last mora.

Note that even though the two contours seem to have the same beginning, the first and second mora tend to be slightly higher in the accented contour than in the unaccented one, although this difference is negligible.

==== Initial lowering ====
Examples of accent in Tokyo Japanese nouns
Pattern	Unimora	Bimora	Trimora
Unaccented	ki (気; 'spirits') /ki/ /ki wa/	hashi (端; 'an edge') /haɕi/ /haɕi wa/	sakura (桜; 'a cherry blossom') /sakɯɾa/ /sakɯɾa wa/
Final-accented	none	hashi (橋; 'a bridge') /haɕi/ /ha ɕi wa/	yasumi (休み; 'rest') /jasɯmi/ /ja sɯmi wa/
Initial-accented	ki (木; 'a tree') /ki/ / ki wa/	hashi (箸; 'a chopstick') / ha ɕi/ / ha ɕi wa/	midori (緑; 'green') / mi doɾi/ / mi doɾi wa/
Medial-accented	none		okashi (お菓子; 'a sweet') /o ka ɕi/ /o ka ɕi wa/

Henceforth, the complex pitch contour can be simplified into a dichotomy of "highs" and "lows" in notations as follows (the corner indicates an accentual fall): (Note: These notations are standard in all the editions of the Shin Meikai Nihongo Akusento Jiten (新明解日本語アクセント辞典) as well as the NHK Nihongo Hatsuon Akusento Jiten (NHK日本語発音アクセント辞典).)

- Accented: μ μμμ μμ
- Unaccented: μμμμμμ

In both cases, that the first mora has a low tone and the second mora a high tone is referred to as "initial lowering" or "initial dissimilation". This is a phonetic feature whose function is to demarcate the beginning of a phrase in Tokyo Japanese. It is a predictable property of a phrase, not of a word. Consider the following:

- /pɯɾiNtaR ɡa/ ← purintā ga (プリンターが; 'printer')
- /ano pɯɾiNtaR ɡa/ ← ano purintā ga (あのプリンターが; 'that printer')
- /tomodacɕi̥ kaɾa kaɾita ano pɯɾiNtaR ɡa/ ← tomodachi kara karita ano purintā ga (友達から借りたあのプリンターが; 'that printer which I borrowed from my friend')
- /kinoR tomodacɕi̥ kaɾa kaɾita ano pɯɾiNtaR ɡa/ ← kinō tomodachi kara karita ano purintā ga (昨日友達から借りたあのプリンターが; 'that printer which I borrowed from my friend yesterday')

In all these cases, initial lowering is never applied to any particular word, but to the entire phrase. Other dialects may have "final lowering" (such as in the Hirosaki dialect) or "initial raising" (語頭隆起, gotō ryūki) (such as in the Bessho dialect in Yurihama, Tottori).

The two aforementioned basic contours occur during the spans of several morae, which necessitates a minimum mora count, but there are not always enough morae for the contours to be fully realized. A unimoraic phrase only carries a high pitch of a would-be second mora, whether that phrase is supposed to be accented or not, making the initial-accented ki (木; /kí/; 'a tree') and the unaccented ki (気; /ki/; 'spirits') sound identical without a following particle or auxiliary. Similarly, a bimoraic phrase whose first mora is unaccented has room for initial lowering, but the second mora has the same high pitch whether it is accented or not, making the final-accented hana (花; /haná/; 'a flower') and the unaccented hana (鼻; /hana/; 'a nose') sound identical without a following particle or auxiliary. Note, still, that at least some speakers can consistently produce differences between ki (木; /kí/) and ki (気; /ki/), and between hana (花; /haná/) and hana (鼻; /hana/), as well as perceive those differences in their own speech. An initial-accented bimoraic or longer phrase does not have room for initial lowering, and the pitch must peak immediately on the first mora, which still begins with a brief, albeit heavily compressed, initial rise from low to high. On the other hand, a second-accented trimoraic or longer phrase does not have room for the slight incline from the high on the second mora to the highest high on the nucleus, and the pitch must peak immediately on the second mora. Thus:

- Unimoraic, accented or not: μ
- Bimoraic or longer, initial-accented: μ μμμμμ
- Bimoraic, accented or not: μμ
- Trimoraic or longer, second-accented: μ μ μμμμ

Conventionally, accent dictionaries still make clear distinctions in notation between ki (木; /kí/), ki (気; /ki/), hana (花; /haná/) and hana (鼻; /hana/):

- Accented: キ , ハ ナ
- Unaccented: キ, ハナ

A pitch track for two variant pronunciations of ki (黄; 'yellow') and ki o (黄を), based on four recordings of a male speaker.

A pitch track for two variant pronunciations of I (亥; 'the Boar') and I no (亥の), based on four recordings of a female speaker.

A pitch track for two variant pronunciations of kita (北; 'north') and kita o (北を), based on four recordings of a male speaker.

A pitch track for two variant pronunciations of mune (棟; 'a roof ridge') and mune o (棟を), based on four recordings of a male speaker.

All pitch tracks were drawn in Praat, with red and blue dashed lines added, based on recordings from the mobile application of NHK Broadcasting Culture Research Institute (2025). Note the differences between the accented contours in red and the unaccented ones in blue, some of which are more marked than others.

Initial lowering may be optionally suppressed, which means that the unaccented first mora simply carries a high tone and flatly transitions into the second mora, if the second mora is /R/ (the lengthening mora) or /N/ (the moraic nasal). Some sources claim initial lowering may also be suppressed if the second mora is /i/ (the offglide mora), but this has not been corroborated by other sources (for more on these exceptional morae, see #Special and deficient morae). In these cases, initial lowering has been said to occur only in "slow, careful, unnatural" enunciation, although it is not conclusive whether the presence or absence of initial lowering is more common. (Note: In eleven different recitations of Gon, the Little Fox (ごん狐, Gongitsune): chīsai (小さい; /cɕiRsái/ 'is small') in the first sentence has initial lowering in four instances, does not in five, has a rise from a high on /R/ to an extra-high on /sa/ in one, and is ambiguous in one; kīta (きいた; /kiRta/ 'heard') in the first sentence has initial lowering in three instances and does not in eight; Gongitsune (ごん狐; /ɡoNɡítsɯne/) in the third sentence has initial lowering in ten instances and does not in one; kiiroku (黄いろく; /kiRroku/ 'being yellow') in the fourteenth sentence has initial lowering in two instances, does not in seven, and is ambiguous in two; sōtto (そうっと; /soRQto/ 'furtively') in the seventeenth sentence has initial lowering in six instances, does not in four, and has a rise from /Q/ to a high on /to/ in one.) If the second mora is /Q/ (the moraic obstruent), the initial rise only happens from the second to third mora. The simplistic "high/low" dichotomy may also fall apart occasionally, "lows" may become "mids" and "highs" may become "extra-highs;" the initial rise may be delayed by one mora in some cases. Thus (the dashed lines represent "mids", the thicker solid line does "extra-highs"):

- The second mora is lengthening: μRμμμμ ~ μRμμμμ ~ μRμμμμ ~ μRμμμμ ~ μRμμμμ
- The second mora is nasal: μNμμμμ ~ μNμμμμ
- The second mora is offglide (?): μiμμμμ ~ μiμμμμ
- The second mora is obstruent: μQμμμμ

For the sake of consistency, textbooks and pronunciation guides ignore all these variations and mark all notations with initial lowering:

- The second mora is lengthening: ○ー○○○○
- The second mora is nasal: ○ン○○○○
- The second mora is offglide: ○イ○○○○
- The second mora is obstruent: ○ッ○○○○

A pitch track for two variant pronunciations of Ōsama (王様; 'His Majesty the King'), one with initial lowering and one without, based on a recording of a female speaker.

A pitch track for sanpo (散歩; 'a stroll'), based on a recording of a female speaker.

A pitch track for naisho (内緒; 'secrecy'), based on a recording of a female speaker.

A pitch track for otto (夫; 'a husband'), based on a recording of a female speaker.

A pitch track for ejjingu (エッジング; 'edging'), based on a recording of a female speaker. This speaker has very little voicing during /Qʑ/.

A pitch track for beddo taun (ベッドタウン; 'a bedroom town'), based on a recording of a male speaker. This speaker has complete voicing during /Qd/.

All pitch tracks were drawn in Praat. Ōsama is based on a recording from the companion website of Kōri (2024), the other female speakers' recordings are from the mobile application of Yamada et al. (2020), and the male speaker's is from the mobile application of NHK Broadcasting Culture Research Institute (2025).

==== Minor and major phrases ====
Japanese accent is not realized on a word level, but on a phrase level. Even words when pronounced in isolation form their own phrases.

A phrase on which one of the aforementioned accent contours is realized is called an "accent(ual) phrase" (アクセント節・アクセント句, akusentosetsu/akusentoku), (Note: "Accent(ual)" means "being the domain of accent, ie the scope of the contours of lexical words.") "minor (phonological) phrase", or "accent unit" (アクセント単位, akusento tan'i). A minor phrase can have maximally one nucleus, and begins with initial lowering. In this article, minor phrases are demarcated with a single vertical bar /|/ (the IPA symbol for a minor break): μμμμμ | μμμμμ.

Multiple minor phrases form together an "intermediate phrase" (中間節, chūkansetsu), (Note: "Intermediate" means "between the accentual phrase and the utterance.") "intonation phrase" (イントネーション句, intonēshonku), (Note: "Intonation" means "being the domain of intonation, ie the scope of declination, downstep, sentence-final rising intonation, emotional and attitudinal intonation, etc.") or "major (phonological) phrase". In this article, major phrases are demarcated with a double vertical bar /‖/ (the IPA symbol for a major break): μμμμμ | μμμμμ ‖ μμμμμ | μμμμμ.

==== Downtrends: declination and downstep ====

Downtrends (下がり傾向, sagari keikō), or phonetic processes of lowering of pitch, unfold during the entire span of a major phrase, rather than being confined to individual minor phrases within it. Once a major phrase ends and a new one begins, the pitch contour, which has been lowered by downtrends in the first major phrase up to that point, is reset at the beginning of the second major phrase.

While the Japanese term for an unaccented contour, heibanshiki (平板式), literally means "flat style", the contour is not literally a flat plateau, but a gradually declining slope on which so-called "high" and "low" tones become progressively lower toward the end of the major phrase. This type of downtrend is known as "declination" (下降 (Note: The term may be shizen kakō (自然下降; lit. 'natural descent'), but there is doubt whether it is actually "natural".), kakō). It is not a purely physiological phenomenon in the sense that as a speaker proceeds through their utterance, they have less airflow energy and therefore necessarily drop their pitch, given that it is perfectly possible to sustain the same pitch in singing for instance. Rather, the speaker likely already has in mind target pitches at the beginning and end of the utterance, and simply executes (even if unconsciously) a transition between those two targets. This is corroborated by the fact that speakers show slower rates of declination at slower speeds of reading and faster rates at faster speeds, while maintaining stable pitch levels at the beginning and end of the utterance.

A pitch track for three variant pronunciations of the accented botchan (坊ちゃん; 'a sonny'), drawn in Praat, based on a recording of a female speaker from the companion website of Kōri (2024). This is a demonstration of three different levels of "high" on /bo/ that still maintain the initial accent.

When an accented minor phrase precedes another accented or unaccented minor phrase, the pitch contour of the second is significantly lower and the contrast between its "highs" and "lows" is compressed. This is a downtrend known as "downstep" (ダウンステップ, daunsuteppu), "downdrift", or "catathesis" (カタセシス, kataseshisu). Downstep is said to produce a more natural-sounding contour, making downstepped highs progressively lower after each nucleus (a "catathesis chain"), rather than keeping all highs equally high as one would in deliberate and slow enunciation. While downstep dampens the accent contour, it does not necessarily flatten it, and the accentual fall can still be preserved so long as there is an adequate, whether small or large, contrast between the nuclear "high" and the postnuclear "low".

==== Combining minor phrases ====
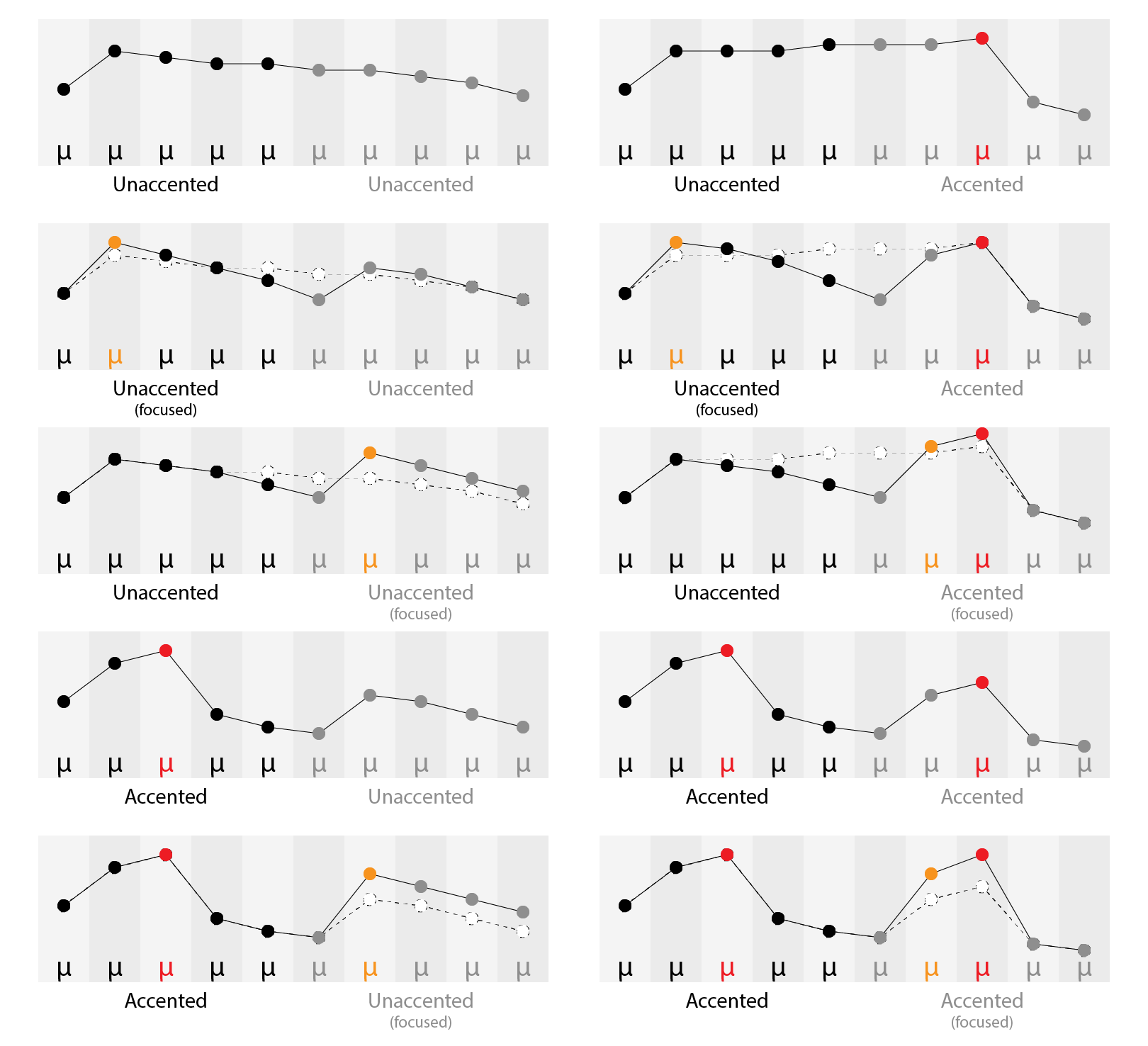

Shorter minor phrases can combine to make longer minor or major phrases. This is typical, and separating minor phrases without special emphasis would make one sound artificial like a first-grade schoolchild reciting in class. Accented and unaccented minor phrases combine differently; when two minor phrases combine:

If the first minor phrase is unaccented, it can merge with the second minor phrase to form an even longer minor phrase. The second minor phrase no longer exists separately, and is thus "dephrased":

- Unaccented + unaccented: μμμμμ | μμμμμ → μμμμμ μμμμμ
- Unaccented + accented: μμμμμ | μ μμ μμ → μ μμμμ μμμ μμ

If the two phrases do not merge, the second phrase has initial lowering, but the high tone on its second mora is not as high as that in the first phrase under declination.

If the first minor phrase is accented, the two minor phrases usually remain separate, with the second minor phrase beginning with initial lowering and becoming downstepped, which lowers its peak pitch roughly by half, three quarters, or more the shorter the second phrase is (downstep is marked here with a superscript downward arrow /ꜜ/ before the first downstepped high tone), although it is not impossible for the second phrase to be heavily flattened or completely dephrased:

- Accented + unaccented: μ μμ μμ | μꜜμμμμ ~ μ μμ μμ μμμμμ
- Accented + accented: μ μμ μμ | μꜜ μμ μμ ~ μ μμ μμ μμμμμ

In the above cases, if the first minor phrase is final-accented and the second minor phrase is an initial-accented particle or particle sequence, the latter is highly likely dephrased:

- Final-accented + initial-accented particle(s): μμμμμ | ꜜ μ μμ → μ μμμμ μμμ

If a minor phrase is "focused" (フォーカス, fōkasu) to convey particularly new and/or important information, its own peak pitch is either raised or at least kept high without any influence of downtrends. The following phrase, on the other hand, is usually either dephrased if the preceding phrase is unaccented, or heavily downstepped if it is accented; (Note: Vance (2008:184) claims that "First-component focus raises the highest pitch of the first component, and it's common to treat the second component as a separate phrase, even when the first component is U" (U means "unaccented"), which contradicts Kōri (2024:47–53, 207–208).) if the following phrase is downstepped, it must be lowered heavily for the focus on the first phrase to be perceptible. Moreover, as focus strength increases, the focused phrase is raised slightly higher and stretched slightly longer while the following unfocused one gets slightly shorter.

Focusing on the second minor phrase resets the pitch range and starts an entirely new major phrase, which means downstep does not apply:

- Unaccented + unaccented (focused): μμμμμ ‖ μμμμμ
- Unaccented + accented (focused): μμμμμ ‖ μ μμ μμ
- Accented + unaccented (focused): μ μμ μμ ‖ μμμμμ
- Accented + accented (focused): μ μμ μμ ‖ μ μμ μμ

===== Weakening and major phrasing =====
Dephrasing and downstep are two main mechanisms to "weaken" the contour of a phrase. Dephrasing tends to happen if the first of two phrases is unaccented, while downstep does if it is accented. "Not weakening" a phrase means to start a new major phrase with no dephrasing nor downstep, and "strengthening" means "not weakening" while also raising the peak pitch even higher.

====== Meaning determination ======
Major phrasing is usually conditioned by the semantic relationship between two phrases. If the first phrase determines the meaning of the second, the second is weakened; otherwise, the second is not weakened and becomes a major phrase. "Meaning determination" (Note: "Determination" is used as a tentative translation here by analogy with determiners (限定詞, genteishi) in English.) (意味の限定, imi no gentei) is when the first phrase limits the scope of the possible referents, attributes, degrees, manners, etc of the second phrase. For example:

The 1st phrase determines the 2nd phrase's meaning	The 1st phrase doesn't determine the 2nd phrase's meaning
shiroi hana ga (白い花が; 'white flowers') /ɕi ɾo i | haꜜ na ɡa/	shiroi yuki ga (白い雪が; 'white snow') /ɕi ɾo i ‖ jɯ ki ɡa/
hiroi ribingu (広いリビング; 'a vast living room') /hi ɾo i | ꜜ ɾi biNɡɯ/	hiroi uchū (広い宇宙; 'the vast universe') /hi ɾo i ‖ ɯ cɕɯR/
Tōkyō no machinami (東京の町並み; 'Tokyo's townscape') /toRkjoR macɕinami/	Tōkyō no Setagaya (東京の世田谷; 'Tokyo's Setagaya') /toRkjoR no ‖ setaɡaja/
yūmei na kaiga (有名な絵画; 'a famous painting') / jɯRmeR na ka iɡa/	yūmei na Ginkakuji (有名な銀閣寺; 'the famous Ginkaku Temple') /jɯRmeR na ‖ ɡi Nkakɯʑi/
tanoshiminagara hataraku (楽しみながら働く; 'works while enjoying') /ta noɕimina ɡaɾa | haꜜtaɾakɯ/	okite hataraku (起きて働く; 'wakes up and works') / o ki̥te ‖ hataɾakɯ/

In the left column of the above table, the first phrase narrows down the second phrase's possibilities, namely white flowers rather than all flowers, a vast living room rather than any other sizes for living rooms, the townscape of Tokyo rather than of other places, a famous painting rather than any other degrees of fame for paintings, working while enjoying something rather than while doing anything else; as such, the second phrase is weakened, ie downstepped or dephrased. On the other hand, in the second column, the first phrase is semantically (but not necessarily rhetorically) redundant and can be omitted without significant loss of meaning, since snow is assumed to be white, the universe is assumed to be vast, Setagaya is a unique ward in Tokyo, the Ginkaku Temple is assumed to be famous, working necessarily requires being awake; as such, the second phrase is not weakened and forms its own major phrase.

Apart from semantic redundancy (stating the obvious), semantic irrelevance also results in lack of meaning determination. For example in ainiku kaerimashita (あいにく帰りました; 'unfortunately, they went home'), ainiku 'unfortunately' does not specify the manner of kaerimashita 'they went home': /ainikɯ̥ ‖ ka eɾima ɕi̥ta/.

Meaning determination is not the same as modification. In the above examples, shiroi modifies both hana and yuki, but only determines the meaning of hana.

The presence of meaning determination is not always as obvious as the above examples make it seem. In engai ni tsuyoi taroimo (塩害に強いタロイモ; 'salt-resistant taro'), it is not immediately obvious whether engai ni tsuyoi 'is resistant to salt damage' determines the meaning of taroimo 'taro': if all varieties of taro are naturally resistant to salt, there are no meaning determination and no weakening, but if only some varieties are, there are. This means that determining the presence of meaning determination in this case requires specific knowledge or research on taro's salt resistance.

In some cases, the first phrase may or may not determine the second phrase's meaning, depending on precisely what the second phrase refers to:

- Natsume Sōseki no {B~b}otchan ni deaimashita (夏目漱石の坊ちゃんに出会いました)
  - /na tsɯme so Rseki no ‖ bo QcɕaN ni | deꜜ aima ɕi̥ta/ 'I happened on Botchan by Natsume Sōseki'
    Natsume Sōseki no 'Natsume Sōseki's' does not determine this particular meaning of Botchan ni, which is famously a novel written by him. Additionally, Botchan ni determines the meaning of deaimashita 'I encountered' (I happened on Botchan rather than on another book).
  - /na tsɯme so Rseki no | ꜜ bo QcɕaN ni | deꜜ aima ɕi̥ta/ 'I happened on Natsume Sōseki's son'
    Natsume Sōseki no determines this particular meaning of botchan ni, which refers to his son rather than someone else's son. (Note: Focus can be put on botchan ni if to emphasize that it is his son, not his daughter, for example.) Additionally, botchan ni determines the meaning of deaimashita (I happened on his son rather than someone or something else).

In the above example, {B~b}otchan has two possible referents which dictate its possible semantic relationships with Natsume Sōseki no. However, even if there is only one referent, intention could still dictate semantic relationship. For example, in Igirisu no Rondon (イギリスのロンドン; 'London, England'), there is only one possible referent, and if Igirisu no 'England's' is truly redundant, Rondon is not to be weakened; but if Igirisu no is meant to clarify that the referent is not London, Ontario nor London, Ohio, it is then not redundant and actually determines the meaning of Rondon which is to be weakened. And even if there were only one London, there would still be many different versions of it in time, which means Rondon is to be weakened in such expressions as ima no Rondon (今のロンドン; 'today's London') and ashita no Rondon (明日のロンドン; 'tomorrow's London').

Surrounding context may also help to figure out whether there is meaning determination or not. For example, in ōki na hokuro (大きな黒子; 'a large mole'), ōki na 'large' determines the meaning of hokuro 'a mole' (a large mole rather than a small or medium-sized one). But if these two phrases are contained in a larger sentence like Hachimaki o shita kao no yokotchō ni, marui hagi no ha ga ichimai, ōki na hokuro mitai ni hebaritsuite imashita. (はちまきをした顔の横っちょうに、まるい萩の葉が一まい、大きな黒子みたいにへばりついていました。; 'To the side of his face, which was in a hachimaki, a single round bush clover leaf was sticking like a large mole.'), (Note: Part of a description of the character Hyōjū from Gon, the Little Fox (ごん狐, Gongitsune).) ōki na becomes semantically (though not rhetorically) redundant, because if a mole is used as a simile for a bush clover leaf, it is assumed to be large.

Pitch tracks for different major phrasings, drawn in Praat, based on three recordings of a female speaker from the companion website of Kōri (2024). From top to bottom: / ke sa ‖ kaQ ta ba kari no ‖ ka sa o ‖ nakɯɕi̥ta/ (Note: This sounds unnatural as none of the phrases are weakened.) / ke sa ‖ kaQ ta ba kari no | ꜜ ka sa o | naꜜkɯɕi̥ta/ / ke sa | kaQꜜ ta ba kari no | ꜜ ka sa o | naꜜkɯɕi̥ta/

Meaning determination only causes weakening if the first phrase determines the meaning of only a single following phrase, not of a group of phrases. Thus:

- Kesa katta bakari no kasa o nakushita (今朝買ったばかりの傘を無くした)
  - / ke sa ‖ kaQ ta ba kari no | ꜜ ka sa o | naꜜkɯɕi̥ta/ 'this morning, I lost the umbrella I'd just bought'
    Kesa 'this morning' does not determine the meaning of katta bakari no 'I'd just bought', but all the phrases after it at once, which means the umbrella was lost this morning but perhaps had been bought sometime earlier. Additionally, katta bakari no determines the meaning of kasa o 'umbrella' (the umbrella I'd just bought rather than any umbrella), and kasa o determines the meaning of nakushita 'I lost' (I lost an umbrella rather than anything else).
  - / ke sa | kaQꜜ ta ba kari no | ꜜ ka sa o | naꜜkɯɕi̥ta/ 'I lost the umbrella I'd just bought this morning'
    Kesa determines the meaning of only katta bakari no, which means the umbrella was bought this morning and perhaps lost sometime later.
- Sono shiroi hana ɡa (その白い花が; 'those white flowers')
  - /sono ‖ ɕi ɾo i | haꜜ na ɡa/
    Sono 'those' does not determine the meaning of shiroi 'white', but shiroi hana 'white flowers' as a whole, and shiroi is therefore not weakened.
- Ryōshin to shokuji o shimashita (両親と食事をしました; 'I had a meal with my parents')
  - / ɾjo RɕiN to ‖ ɕo kɯʑiN o ɕima ɕi̥ta/
    Ryōshin to 'with my parents' does not determine the meaning of shokuji o 'a meal', but shokuji o shimashita 'I had a meal' as a whole, and shokuji o is therefore not weakened. If ryōshin to no, whose meaning is similar to ryōshin to, were used here, it would be grammatically an attributive expression that only modifies the noun after it, and therefore would determine the meaning of shokuji o. Additionally, shokuji o determines the meaning of shimashita 'I did' (I had a meal rather than doing anything else).

In some cases, it is the second phrase that determines the meaning of the first phrase, in which case the second phrase is not weakened:

- The second phrase specifies a particular part of the first phrase's referent:
  - Chūgoku no nanbu (中国の南部; 'the southern part of China')
    - / cɕɯ Rɡokɯ no ‖ na Nbɯ/
      Nanbu 'the southern part' determines the meaning of Chūgoku 'China' and specifies that it is the southern, not northern, western nor eastern part of China. But if the intended meaning is "it's the southern part of China, not of another country", Chūgoku determines the meaning of nanbu which is then weakened.
- The second phrase specifies a particular type of the first phrase's referent:
  - Kamakiri no osu (カマキリのオス; 'the male of the mantis')
    - / ka makiɾi no ‖ osɯ/
      Osu 'a male' determines the meaning of kamakiri 'a mantis' and specifies that it is the male, not the female of the species.
- The second phrase specifies a way of altering the first phrase's referent:
  - Kajiki no kurīmuni (カジキのクリーム煮; 'cream-boiled billfish')
    - / ka ʑiki no ‖ kɯɾiRmɯni/
      Kurīmuni 'a dish made by boiling in cream sauce' determines the meaning of kajiki 'a billfish' and specifies the way billfish are cooked.

Such pairs as kyabetsu to hakusai (キャベツと白菜; 'cabbage and napa cabbage'), Perū ya Chiri (ペルーやチリ; 'Peru or Chile'), yoru de mo hiru de mo (夜でも昼でも; 'whether night or day'), asa kara ban made (朝から晩まで; 'from morning to evening'), etc contain two phrases parallel in meaning, and thus undergo no meaning determination nor weakening on the second phrase (in some cases, it is the first phrase, not the second, that is lowered). However, when these pairs are treated as single units, their second phrase may be weakened, and both their first and second phrases may be weakened progressively after yet another phrase. In some cases, whether to treat a pair as a single unit changes the intended meaning:

- Haha no Hi no purezento wa, watashi no ani to otōto de okane o dashiatte kaimashita (母の日のプレゼントは、私の兄と弟でお金を出し合って買いました; 'She chipped in with my big and little brothers and bought a Mother's Day present')
  - / ha ha no hi no | pɯꜜ ɾe zeNto wa ‖ wa taɕi no a ni | oꜜ toRto de ‖ okane o ‖ da ɕia Qte | kaꜜ ima ɕi̥ta/
    Ani to 'elder brother and' and otōto de 'with younger brother' are treated as a single unit, and progressively weakened after watashi no 'my', with ani to dephrased and otōto de downstepped.
- Boku wa Hanako to Tarō no uchi ni itta (僕は花子と太郎の家に行った)
  - / bo kɯ wa ‖ ha nako to | ꜜ ta ɾoR no | ɯꜜ cɕi ni | iQꜜta/ 'I went to Hanako's and Tarō's house'
    Hanako to 'and Hanako' and Tarō no 'Tarō's' are treated as a single unit, which means it is both their house.
  - / bo kɯ wa ‖ ha nako to ‖ ta ɾoR no | ɯꜜ cɕi ni | iQꜜta/ 'I went with Hanako to Tarō's house'
    Hanako to 'with Hanako' and Tarō no are not treated as a single unit, which means it is only Tarō's house.

====== Focus ======
Another reason to start a new major phrase is to add focus to new and/or important information. This does not necessarily involve strengthening a phrase, but primarily not weakening it while weakening the phrase after it to add enough contrast between the two phrases. The very last phrase of the sentence can be in focus by not weakening alone, without any strengthening.

- Kyō wa remon de zerī o tsukutta n desu (今日はレモンでゼリーを作ったんです)
  - / kjo R wa ‖ ɾe moN de | ꜜ ze ɾiR o | tsɯ̥ꜜ kɯ Qta N desɯ/ '[I make jelly as a hobby, and] today I made jelly with LEMONS [specifically]'
    Remon de 'with lemons' is focused, zerī o 'jelly' and tsukutta n desu 'it's that I made' are progressively weakened by downstep.
  - / kjo R wa ‖ ɾe moN de ‖ ze ɾiR o | tsɯ̥ꜜ kɯ Qta N desɯ/ '[I usually make JUICE with lemons, but] today I made JELLY with lemons'
    Zerī o is focused, tsukutta n desu is weakened by downstep.
- Kyō wa butaniku de nikujaga o tsukutta n desu (今日は豚肉で肉ジャガを作ったんです)
  - / kjo R wa ‖ bɯ tanikɯ de nikɯʑaɡa o tsɯ̥kɯ Qta N desɯ/ '[I usually make nikujaga with BEEF, but] today I made nikujaga with PORK'
    Butaniku de 'pork' is focused, nikujaga o and tsukutta n desu are together weakened by dephrasing.
  - / kjo R wa ‖ bɯtanikɯ de ‖ ni kɯʑaɡa o tsɯ̥kɯ Qta N desɯ/ '[I usually make TONKATSU with pork, but] today I made NIKUJAGA with pork'
    Nikujaga o is focused, tsukutta n desu is weakened by dephrasing.
- Furu to omotta (降ると思った)
  - / ɸɯ ɾɯ to | oꜜ mo Qta/ '[It DIDN'T rain.] I thought it WOULD rain'
  - / ɸɯ ɾɯ to ‖ o mo Qta/ '[It RAINED.] I THOUGHT it would rain'
- Gon wa, hotto shite ana kara haidemashita (ごんは、ほっとして穴からはい出ました; 'Gon was relieved and CRAWLED OUT from the hole')
  - / ɡo N wa ‖ hoQto ɕi̥te ‖ a na kaɾa ‖ haidema ɕi̥ta/
    Haidemashita 'crawled out' is focused and does not need strengthening.

There may be more than one instances of focus in a sentence.

- Todoita no wa naze ka mafurā ga nimai datta n desu (届いたのは何故かマフラーが２枚だったんです; '[I ordered ONE SHAWL, but for some reason] what arrived was TWO MUFFLERS')
  - /to do ita no wa ‖ na ze ka ‖ ma ɸɯɾaR ɡa ‖ ni mai daQta N desɯ/
    There are two phrases with their own contrastive focus, mafurā ga 'mufflers', which contrasts with "shawl", and nimai datta n desu 'it's that it was two' which contrasts with "one".

Multiple phrases can be important as a whole rather than as discrete phrases. In this case, there are not multiple instances of focus on individual phrases as above, but only one on the very first phrase, and the other phrases' phrasing depends on meaning determination instead.

- Ken'ōdō no uchimawari wa Ebina Jankushon de Hachiōji hōmen kara no kuruma ga sankiro no jūtai desu (圏央道の内回りは海老名ジャンクションで八王子方面からの車が３キロの渋滞です; 'As for the inner loop of the Ken-O Expressway, traffic from the Hachiōji side is congested within three kilometres at Ebina Junction')
  - /ke No RdoR no ‖ ɯ cɕima waɾi wa ‖ e bina ʑa Nkɯ̥ɕoN de ‖ ha cɕioRʑi ho RmeN kaɾa no | kɯꜜɾɯma ɡa ‖ sa Nkiɾo no | ꜜ ʑɯRtai de sɯ/
    Every phrase in this sentence is important, but only the first and the one after the particle wa are in focus. Uchimawari wa 'the inner loop' actually determines the meaning of Ken'ōdō 'the Ken-O Expressway' before it (the inner loop rather than another part of the expressway), which is why it is not weakened. Other phrases are weakened as usual.

If there are two clauses and focus on both, weakening stops at the end of the first clause; if there is focus only on the first clause, weakening can spread to the second:

- Tabi o anata ga shita nara, watashi wa tsukiawanai (旅をあなたがしたいなら、私はつきあわない; 'if you want to be on a TRIP, I WON'T BE GOING WITH YOU')
  - /ta bi o | aꜜ na ta ɡa | ɕi̥ꜜ tai na ɾa ‖ wataɕi wa ‖ tsɯ̥ kiawa nai/
    The weakening on the first clause (before the comma) stops at nara because there is focus on the second clause.
- Petto o kaitakatta kara, koko ni hikkoshita n desu (ペットを飼いたかったから、ここに引っ越したんです; 'I wanted to own a PET, that's why I moved here')
  - / pe Qto o | ꜜ kaita kaQta kaɾa | koꜜ ko ni hi̥Qko ɕi̥ta N desɯ/
    The weakening on the first clause spreads to the end of the sentence because there is no focus on the second clause.

In noun+particle+predicate constructions, the noun+particle phrase generally determines the meaning of the predicate phrase. Exceptions include the topical particles wa (は) and tte (って), which throw focus on the predicate. However, particles are prone to omission, in which case the presence of weakening may help clarify the meaning.

- Pengin wa tori da (ペンギンは鳥だ; 'Penguins? They're BIRDS.')
  - /peNɡiN wa ‖ toɾi da/
- Aitsu sokkuri da (あいつそっくりだ)
  - /aitsɯ̥ ‖ soQ kɯ ɾi da/ 'that guy looks EXACTLY like him'
    If the focus is on sokkuri da 'is identical', an implied wa throws focus on it.
  - /a itsɯ̥ soQkɯ ɾi da/ 'he looks exactly like THAT GUY'
    If the focus is on aitsu 'that guy' and sokkuri da is weakened, there is an implied ni that comes with the adjectival noun sokkuri in the construction A wa B ni sokkuri da 'A is identical to B'.

If instead of merely throwing focus on what follows it, wa contrasts what precedes it with something else; or if the clause with wa is merely used to quote something, as in […] to A wa omou ([…]とAは思う; 'A thinks that […]'), […] to A wa yū ([…]とAは言う; 'A says that […]'), etc; it is what precedes wa that is in focus.

- Kotchi wa daijōbu da kedo, sotchi wa? (こっちはだいじょうぶだけど、そっちは？; 'THIS is fine, but what about THAT?')
  - /koQ cɕi wa | daꜜ iʑo Rbɯ da kedo ‖ soQ cɕi ↗waR/
    The final particle wa has a rising tone to indicate a question.
- Watashi wa chigaimasu (私は違います; '[YOU may be like that, but] I'M not')
  - /wataɕi wa | cɕiꜜ ɡaima sɯ/
    The pitch of particle wa itself can be raised, here indicated with a thicker overline.
- “Hyōjū da na.” to Gon wa omoimashita. (「兵十だな。」とごんは思いました。; '“It’s HYŌJŪ,” Gon thought.')
  - / hjo RʑɯR da na | to ꜜ ɡo N wa | oꜜ moima ɕi̥ta/
    The final particle na bears a high tone due to final intonation, not accent.

Other types of expressions that often attract focus include predicates of yes/no questions (Kyō, gohan iru no? (今日、御飯いるの？; 'IS there rice today?')), interrogative expressions (itsu (何時; 'when'), nan de (何で; 'why'), etc), negative expressions (oboete nai (覚えてない; 'DOESN'T remember'), kimatte 'masen (決まってません; 'HASN'T decided')), imperative expressions (nenasai (寝なさい; 'please go to bed'), mite kite yo (見てきてよ; 'please come check this out'), etc), intensifying adverbials (sugoku (凄く; 'very'), tote mo (とても; 'very'), etc), quantifying adverbials (takusan (沢山; 'a lot'), zenbu (全部; 'all'), etc), ideophones (kirakira, kinkin, etc), restrictive particles (itazura bakari (悪戯ばかり; 'NOTHING BUT mischief'), kiken dake (棄権だけ; 'ONLY abstention'), etc), etc.

===== Smooth vs abrupt transitions =====

When an unaccented minor phrase transitions into the next phrase without dephrasing it, there are two possibilities. One, as shown in the graphs above, there is smooth declination from the first phrase's high tone on its second mora to the second's initial low tone. Two, the first phrase's contour remains relatively high throughout and there is an abrupt transition from its last mora to the second phrase's initial low.

=== Special and deficient morae ===
Most morae are known as "autonomous/independent morae" (自立拍・自立モーラ, jiritsuhaku/jiritsu mōra) and they are capable of bearing an accent and being a nucleus. The morae that are not are known as "dependent morae" (非自立モーラ, hijiritsu mōra), "special morae" (特殊拍・特殊モーラ, tokushuhaku/tokushu mōra), "special phonemes" (特殊音素, tokushu onso), "special segments", "mora(ic) phonemes" (モーラ音素, mōra onso) or "moraic segments". There are four such morae:

- The mora(ic) nasal (撥音/撥ねる音, hatsuon/haneru on), spelt ん or ン in kana and notated phonologically /N/.
- The mora(ic) obstruent (促音/詰まる音, sokuon/tsumaru on), spelt っ or ッ in kana and notated phonologically /Q/.
- The second half of a long vowel, henceforth called the lengthening mora (引（き）音/長音, hikion~in'on/chōon), spelt あ・ア・い・イ・う・ウ・え・エ・お・オ・ー in kana and notated phonologically /R/ or /H/. For more on the relationship between accent and long vowels, see Japanese phonology § Long vowels and vowel sequences.
- The second half of a "diphthong" (二重母音の後部母音, nijū boin no kōbu boin), henceforth called the offglide mora, spelt い・イ・う・ウ and notated phonologically, individually /i, ɯ/, or collectively /J/. Note that if /i, ɯ/ do not directly follow a vowel, or are the second half in /ii → iR, ɯɯ → ɯR/, they are not offglide morae. The "diphthongs" of Japanese include principally /ei, ai, oi, ɯi/ and less frequently /aɯ/ (/iɯ, eɯ, oɯ/ are probably not diphthongs). /ei/ is alternatively pronounced /eR/ with a lengthening mora, except in ei (鱏; /éi/ 'a ray'), rei (レイ; /ɾéi/ 'a lei'), etc; and purportedly except across morpheme boundaries, perhaps in careful pronunciation, as in me-isha (眼医者; /mé-iɕa/ 'an oculist'; compare mei-sha (名車; /mei-ɕa ~ meR-ɕa/ 'a famous car')), yake-ishi (焼け石; /jake-iɕi/ 'a hot stone'), etc.

Proponents of the Japanese "syllable" consider it a sequence of a autonomous mora optionally followed by a special mora. Examples of Japanese "syllables" would be /a, aN, aQ, aR, ai, aɯ/. If a Tokyo syllable is to be accented, only its first mora is the actual nucleus, hence / a , a N, a Q, a R, a i, a ɯ/. Henceforth, the nucleus is marked with an acute accent for simplicity, as in /á, áN, áQ, áR, ái, áɯ/. The syllable is accentually more salient in other dialects, such as Kagoshima Japanese, and if a Kagoshima syllable is to carry a high tone, both its morae carry that high tone.

The class of special morae are not the only ones that cannot be nuclei. In certain contexts, even "autonomous" morae can behave similarly in failing to be nuclei as well. These morae can form a larger class known as "deficient morae", which include morae with devoiced and/or epenthetic vowels.

=== Accent shifts ===
Since deficient morae cannot bear accent, if an accent rule would put an accent on them, an "accent shift" is necessitated. Labrune (2012) counts all instances where an accent is not in the exact location generalized by a rule as "accent shifts;" Vance (2008) only counts instances involving devoiced and/or epenthetic vowels, and treat those involving special morae as "accented syllables" rather than "accented morae".

Consider the suffix ‑shi (市; 'a city'). The accent rule for it is that when it follows a city's name, it places an accent on that name's last mora:

- Ōsakashi (大阪県; 'Osaka City'): /oRsaká-ɕi/

If that last mora is special, a leftward shift is necessitated; or, the above rule can be restated as "it places an accent on that name's last syllable" (Note: A counterargument to the "accented syllable" is that only its first mora bears a high tone while its second mora bears a low tone, which runs counter to languages in which accented syllables doubtless occur.) (the superscript question mark ^{?} marks dubious accent due to noncommittal and/or contradictory sources):

- Leftward shift away from a moraic nasal: Muroranshi (室蘭市; 'Muroran City'): /*mɯɾoɾaŃ-ɕi → mɯɾoɾáN-ɕi/
- Leftward shift away from a lengthening mora: Kitakyūshūshi (北九州市; 'Kitakyushu City'): /*ki̥takjɯRɕɯŔ-ɕi → ki̥takjɯRɕɯ́R-ɕi/
- Leftward shift away from an offglide mora:
  - Sendaishi (仙(せん)台(だい)市; 'Sendai City'): /*seNdaí-ɕi → seNdái-ɕi/
  - Munbaishi (ムンバイ市; 'Mumbai City'): /^{?}mɯNbaí-ɕi → mɯNbái-ɕi/
  - Hanoishi (ハノイ市; 'Hanoi City'): /^{?}hanoí-ɕi → hanói-ɕi/
    According to some sources but perhaps in spite of actual usage, it is possible for /i/ to occasionally not trigger a shift. In some cases, there may be a morpheme boundary between it and the preceding vowel:
  - Fukuishi (福(ふく)井(い)市; 'Fukui City'): /^{?}ɸɯ̥kɯí-ɕi → ɸɯ̥kɯ́i-ɕi/ (Note: For some reason NHK Broadcasting Culture Research Institute (2025:1179) only lists a shifted pronunciation for Fukuishi, but not for Fukuiken (福井県; 'Fukui Prefecture'): /ɸɯ̥kɯí-keN/.)
  - Aioishi (相(あい)生(おい)市; 'Aioi City'): /^{?}aioí-ɕi → aiói-ɕi/
  - Inzaishi (印(いん)西(ざい)市; 'Inzai City'): /^{?}iNzaí-ɕi → iNzái-ɕi/
  - Utashinaishi (歌(うた)志(し)内(ない)市; 'Utashinai City'): /^{?}ɯtaɕinaí-ɕi → ɯtaɕinái-ɕi/
  - Bisaushi (ビサウ市; 'Bissau City'): /bisaɯ́-ɕi → ^{?}bisáɯ-ɕi/
    Unlike /i/, /ɯ/ is not obligatorily treated as an offglide beat:
  - chigau no (違うの; 'it's that it differs'): /cɕiɡaɯ́ no → ^{?}cɕiɡáɯ no/
  - Donaugawa (ドナウ川; 'the Danube'): /donaɯ́-ɡawa → ^{?}donáɯ-ɡawa/

Exceptions to these leftward shifts involve two consecutive special morae, in which case the accent usually stays on the first special mora and does not shift any further leftward. Compare the suffixes ‑bashi (橋), ‑jin (人) and ‑kko (っ子), the last of which is capable of causing two consecutive special morae:

- Rondonbashi (ロンドン橋; 'London Bridge'): /*ɾoNdoŃ-baɕi → ɾoNdóN-baɕi/
- gendaijin (現代人; 'a modern person'): /*ɡeNdaíʑiN → ɡeNdái-ʑiN/
- Rondonkko (ロンドンっ子; 'a Londoner'): /ɾoNdoŃ-Qko ^{?}(→ ɾoNdóN-Qko)/
- gendaikko (現代っ子; 'one of the kids these days'): /ɡeNdaí-Qko ^{?}(→ ɡeNdái-Qko)/

A pitch track for /koŔNcɕa/ and /koRŃcɕa/, two variant pronunciations of kōncha (コーン茶; 'corn tea'), based on two recordings of a male speaker.

A pitch track for /cɕéRNteN/ and /cɕeŔNteN/, two variant pronunciations of chēnten (チェーン店; 'a chain store'), based on two recordings of another male speaker.

All pitch tracks were drawn in Praat, with red dashed lines added, based on recordings from the mobile application of NHK Broadcasting Culture Research Institute (2025).

Recent loanwords (外来語, gairaigo) may contain consecutive special morae to begin with, which blocks further shifts, or allows options with no shift:

- Rinkānhai (リンカーン杯; 'the Lincoln Cup'): /ɾiNkaRŃ-hai → ɾiNkaŔN-hai ^{?}(→ ɾiNkáRN-hai)/
- kōncha (コーン茶; 'corn tea'): /koRŃ-cɕa → koŔN-cɕa → kóRN-cɕa/
- chēnten (チェーン店; 'a chain store'): /*cɕeRŃ-teN → cɕeŔN-teN → cɕéRN-teN/

The seemingly offglide mora /i/ in the sequences /iN/ and /iQ/ in loanwords can be a nucleus, compared to the actual offglide mora /i/ in the above examples. In the following examples, an accent is triggered by a suffix, or placed by default on the antepenultimate mora (the "antepenultimate rule"):

- Raingawa (ライン川; 'the Rhine'): /*ɾaiŃ-ɡawa → ɾaíN-ɡawa *(→ ɾáiN-ɡawa)/
- Supeinkaze (スペイン風邪; 'the Spanish flu'): /sɯ̥peiŃ-kaze → sɯ̥peíN-kaze *(→ sɯ̥péiN-kaze)/
- koinshō (コイン商; 'a coin dealer'): /koiŃ-ɕoR → koíN-ɕoR *(→ kóiN-ɕoR)/
- hoissuru (ホイッスル; 'a whistle'): /*hoiQ́sɯɾɯ → hoíQsɯɾɯ *(→ hóiQsɯɾɯ)/
- sandoitchi (サンドイッチ; 'a sandwich'): /saNdoíQcɕi *(→ saNdóiQcɕi)/
- kuikku (クイック; 'quick'): /kɯíQkɯ *(→ kɯ́iQkɯ)/

Some sources also claim a leftward shift is possible if the would-be accented mora is devoiced, but this has been disputed as incorrect in the current paradigm.

- Leftward shift away from a devoiced vowel:
  - Nagasakishi (長崎市; 'Nagasaki City'): /naɡasakí̥-ɕi → ^{?}naɡasáki̥-ɕi/
  - jūrokusai (十六歳; 'sixteen years old'): /ʑɯRɾokɯ̥́-sai → ^{?}ʑɯRɾókɯ̥-sai/
  - kanashikatta (悲しかった; 'was sad'): /kanaɕí̥kaQta → ^{?}kanáɕi̥kaQta/

A leftward shift away from a devoiced vowel is said to only happen if there are at least two morae before the devoiced vowel; consequently, the accent never reaches the first mora, which remains lowered due to initial lowering. And unlike shifts away from special morae which are obligatory, shifts away from devoiced vowels are optional at best and increasingly infrequent. The current tendency is to keep the accent where it is supposed to be on the devoiced vowel.

If there are less than two morae before an accented devoiced vowel, a rightward shift may occur instead. Like leftward shifts, rightward shifts have become uncommon and are now used primarily by older speakers.

- Rightward shift away from a devoiced vowel:
  - There are no morae before the devoiced vowel:
    - shiki (四季; 'the four seasons'): /ɕí̥ki → ɕi̥kí/
    - kite (来て; 'coming and'): /kí̥te → ^{?}ki̥té/
    - futte (降って; 'descending and'): /ɸɯ̥́Qte → *ɸɯ̥Q́te → ^{?}ɸɯ̥Qté/
    - fusu (付す; 'attaches'): /ɸɯ̥́sɯ → ɸɯ̥sɯ́/
    - Fusako (富佐子): /ɸɯ̥́sako → ^{?}ɸɯ̥sáko/
  - There is only one mora before the devoiced vowel:
    - kakusu (隠す; 'conceals'): /kakɯ̥́sɯ → ^{?}kakɯ̥sɯ́/
    - Ichikawa (市川): /icɕí̥kawa → icɕi̥káwa/
    - Ashikaga (足利): /*aɕí̥kaɡa → aɕi̥káɡa/
    - rokusai (六歳; 'six years old'): /ɾokɯ̥́-sai → ^{?}ɾokɯ̥-sái/
    - Katsushika Hokusai (葛飾北斎): /katsɯ́ɕi̥ka | *hokɯ̥́sai → katsɯ́ɕi̥ka | hokɯ̥sái/
    - Gifuken (岐阜県; 'Gifu Prefecture'): /ɡiɸɯ̥́-keN → ^{?}ɡiɸɯ̥-kéN/

In contrast, a shift away from a special mora is leftward regardless of the number of the morae before the special mora, and it is normal for the accent to reach the first mora:

- Leftward shift away from a special mora:
  - ronji (論じ; 'discussing'): /*ɾoŃʑi → ɾóNʑi/
  - kyōshi (供し; 'offering'): /*kjoŔɕi → kjóRɕi/
  - aishi (愛し; 'loving'): /*aíɕi → áiɕi/

A pitch track for /ɕi̥kakɯ̥́keR/, /ɕi̥kákɯ̥keR/ and /ɕi̥káQkeR/, three variant pronunciations of 四角形 ('a quadrilateral'), drawn in Praat, with red dashed lines added, based on three recordings of a male speaker from the mobile application of NHK Broadcasting Culture Research Institute (2025).

Examples of accent shifts away from the moraic obstruent /Q/ as a result of a suffix like ‑shi are less common. They often contain the sequence /Qk/, which is a variant of /kɯ̥k/, or result from combinations of numerals and counters.

- Leftward shift away from a devoiced vowel or a moraic obstruent:
  - shikakukei → shikakkei (四角形; 'a quadrilateral'): /ɕi̥kakɯ̥́-kei → ɕi̥kákɯ̥-kei → ɕi̥káQ-kei/
  - issai (一歳; 'one year old'): /*iQ́-sai → íQ-sai/

Loanwords often follow the antepenultimate rule, and yet there seems to be a leftward shift away from an epenthetic vowel in certain recent loanwords (see Epenthesis § Borrowed words).

- Leftward shift away from an epenthetic vowel:
  - Amusuterudamu (アムステルダム): /*amɯsɯ̥teɾɯ́damɯ → amɯsɯ̥téɾɯdamɯ/ ← Dutch Amsterdam /ˌɑmstərˈdɑm/
  - enerugī (エネルギー; 'energy'): /eneɾɯ́ɡiR → enéɾɯɡiR/ ← German Energie /enɛʁˈɡiː/

=== Consecutive devoiceable vowels and accent ===
When there are two consecutive devoiceable vowels, the regularly accented one has been said to stay voiced, although it is common nowadays for both of them to be devoiced. Examples with contradictory claims would be adjectival gerunds ending in ‑shikute; compare:

- /i/ is accented and voiced, /ɯ/ is devoiced: /kanaɕíkɯ̥te/
- /i/ is devoiced, /ɯ/ is voiced, the accent shifts leftward: /kanáɕi̥kɯte/
- Both /i/ and /ɯ/ are devoiced, /i/ is accented: /kanaɕí̥kɯ̥te/
- Both /i/ and /ɯ/ are devoiced, the accent shifts leftward: /kanáɕi̥kɯ̥te/

A pitch track for /kanaɕí̥kɯ̥te/ and /kanáɕi̥kɯ̥te/, two variant pronunciations of kanashikute (悲しくて; 'being sad and'), drawn in Praat, with red dashed lines added, based on two recordings of a male speaker from the mobile application of NHK Broadcasting Culture Research Institute (2025).

=== Pitch raising ===
The defining characteristic of accent in Tokyo Japanese is a steep fall from a high tone on the nucleus to a low tone. This means that a nucleus is necessarily voiced for it to have any tone at all, much less specifically a high one, as tones are generated by voicing. Yet, it is frequently the case that devoiced vowels, particularly the high vowels /i, ɯ/, are nuclear. The transition from an illusory, voiceless "high" to the following low is significantly different from an actual high, in that the pitch of the following low is higher in the former case. This phenomenon has been termed pitch raising. Experiments have shown that a voiceless nucleus raises the pitch of the following low tone significantly. The degree of raising depends on how close the voiceless nucleus is to the low, which is raised the most when it comes right after the nucleus, for example in the nonsense test phrase /ɸɯ̥ɕi̥tsɯ̥́ to/. In this case, the low tone on /to/ is raised because of the voiceless nuclear "high" on /tsɯ̥́/. If the nuclear "high" and the low are separated by voiceless "lows", there is less pitch raising as the nuclear "high" becomes farther away from the low, as in /ɸɯ̥ɕí̥tsɯ̥ to/ and /ɸɯ̥́ɕi̥tsɯ̥ to/. In the absence of a true accentual fall from high to low, pitch raising is the primary phonetic cue for perceiving the presence of a nucleus.

Pitch raising may be suppressed in the presence of a phrasal high, ie a high on a voiced segment before the voiceless nuclear "high". For example, in utsushi to (写しと; 'a copy'), whose nucleus is /ɕí/, which is devoiced before the quotative particle /to/, pitch raising may be suppressed in /ɯtsɯɕí̥ to/ where the second /ɯ/ is voiced and bears a high (the first /ɯ/ is low due to initial lowering), but realized normally in /ɯtsɯ̥ɕí̥ to/ where /ɯ̥/ is voiceless and incapable of bearing any tone, much less a high.

Pitch raising has been attributed to an overlap of activity between the cricothyroid and sternohyoid muscles, the former of which is said to regulate pitch but to still be active during devoicing, while the latter is said to cause pitch falls, in words where the nucleus is voiceless. Such overlap is not present in words where the nucleus is voiced.

A pitch track for /átsɯ̥kɯ/ and /atsɯ̥́kɯ/, two variant pronunciations of atsuku (熱く; 'being hot'), based on two recordings of a female speaker.

A pitch track for /átsɯ̥kaQta/ and /atsɯ̥́kaQta/, two variant pronunciations of atsukatta (熱かった; 'was hot'), based on two recordings of a female speaker.

A pitch track for /ɕi̥kí/ (in blue) and /ɕí̥ki/ (in red), two variant pronunciations of shiki (四季; 'the four seasons'), as well as for /ɕi̥kí o/ (in blue) and /ɕí̥ki o/ (in red), based on four recordings of a male speaker.

A pitch track for /ɯɾéɕi̥kɯ/ and /ɯɾeɕí̥kɯ/, two variant pronunciations of ureshiku (嬉しく; 'being joyful'), based on two recordings of a female speaker. In the latter pronunciation, there is a phrasal high tone before the voiceless nucleus.

A pitch track for /ɯɾéɕi̥kaQta/ and /ɯɾeɕí̥kaQta/, two variant pronunciations of ureshikatta (嬉しかった; 'was joyful'), based on two recordings of a female speaker. In the latter pronunciation, there is a phrasal high tone before the voiceless nucleus.

All pitch tracks were drawn in Praat, with red and blue dashed lines added. Atsuku, ureshiku, shiki and shiki o were based on recordings from the mobile application of NHK Broadcasting Culture Research Institute (2025), and atsukatta and ureshikatta were based on recordings at the Online Japanese Accent Dictionary.

=== Accentually minimal sets ===
Minimal set demonstration
A recording of a native Tokyo speaker who demonstrates five accentually minimal sets.

In standard Japanese, about 47% of words are unaccented and around 26% are accented on the antepenultimate mora. However, this distribution is highly variable between word categories. For example, 70% of native nouns are unaccented, while only 50% of Sino-Japanese nouns and only 7% of recent loanwords are unaccented. In general, most uni- or bimoraic words are accented on the first mora, tri- or quadrimoraic words are unaccented, and words of greater length are almost always accented on one of the last five morae.

The following table shows samples of minimal sets whose members contrast only by accent.

Samples of accentually minimal sets
Unaccented	ki (気; 'spirits')	/ki/ /ki wa/	sake (酒; 'liquor')	/sake/ /sake wa/	kaki (柿; 'an Oriental persimmon')	/kaki/ /kaki wa/	hashi (端; 'an edge')	/haɕi/ /haɕi wa/	hana (鼻; 'a nose')	/hana/ /hana wa/				
Final-accented					kaki (垣; 'a fence')	/kaki/ /ka ki wa/	hashi (橋; 'a bridge')	/haɕi/ /ha ɕi wa/	hana (花; 'a flower')	/hana/ /ha na wa/	ima (居間; 'a living room') (Note: Alternatively initial-accented and completely homophonous with ima (今; 'now').)	/ima/ /i ma wa/		
Initial-accented	ki (木; 'a tree')	/ki/ / ki wa/	sake (鮭; 'a chum salmon')	/ sa ke/ / sa ke wa/	kaki (牡蠣; 'an oyster')	/ ka ki/ / ka ki wa/	hashi (箸; 'a chopstick')	/ ha ɕi/ / ha ɕi wa/	hana (端; 'an edge')	/ ha na/ / ha na wa/	ima (今; 'now')	/ i ma/ / i ma wa/	nihon (二本; 'two long and thin things')	/ ni hoN/ / ni hoN wa/
Medial-accented													Nihon (日本; 'Japan')	/ni ho N/ /ni ho N wa/

As previously said in #Accent patterns and #Initial lowering, without a following particle or auxiliary, it is difficult, if not impossible, to distinguish words whose nuclei are their last morae from unaccented words. In 2014, a study recording the electrical activity of the brain showed that native Japanese speakers mainly use context, rather than pitch accent information, to contrast between words that differ only in pitch.

== Tokyo-style accent ==
Accent systems that are concerned with the presence and location of the nucleus alone (n+1-pattern) have been termed Tokyo systems (東京式アクセント, Tōkyōshiki akusento). The "lowering nucleus/kernel" (下げ核, sagekaku), or a nucleus that precedes an accentual fall, is characteristic of Tokyo Japanese, but it is by no means the only way for accent to be realized. Other dialects may feature the "ascending nucleus/kernel" (昇り核, noborikaku) which follows an accentual rise, or the "raising nucleus/kernel" (上げ核, agekaku) which precedes an accentual rise; the difference between an "ascending" nucleus and a "raising" nucleus is that when the latter is at the end of a lexical word, the accentual rise is only realized on a following particle.

=== Toyama accent ===
The Toyama dialect has a system with the lowering nucleus similar to that of the Tokyo dialect, but the lexical items belonging to each pattern differ:

Pattern	Unimoraic	Bimoraic	Trimoraic	Quadrimoraic	
Unaccented	μ	μμ	μμμ	μμμμ	
Unaccented	hi (火; 'a fire') / hi / ka (蚊; 'a mosquito') / ka /	hi ga (火が) / hi ɡa / ka ga (蚊が) / ka ɡa / kaze (風; 'wind') / kaze / ame (飴; 'candy') / ame /	kaze ga (風が) / kaze ɡa / ame ga (飴が) / ame ɡa / sakana (魚; 'a fish') / sakana /	sakana ga (魚が) / sakana ɡa /	
Final-accented	none	μμ	μμμ	μμμμ	
Final-accented	none	yama (山; 'a mountain') / jama / ame (雨; 'rain') / ame / imo (芋; 'a potato') / imo /	katana (刀) / katana / otoko (男; 'a male person') / otoko /		
Medial-accented	none		μμμ	μμμμ	μμμμ
Medial-accented	none		yama ga (山が) / jama ɡa / ame ga (雨が) / ame ɡa / imo ga (芋が) / imo ɡa / kokoro (心; 'a heart') / kokoɾo /	kokoro ga (心が) / kokoɾo ɡa /	katana ga (刀が) / katana ɡa / otoko ga (男が) / otoko ɡa /
Initial-accented	μ	μμ	μμμ	μμμμ	
Initial-accented	hi (日; 'the sun') / hi / ke (毛; 'hair') / ke /	hi ga (日が) / hi ɡa / ke ga (毛が) / ke ɡa / mimi (耳; 'an ear') / mimi / toki (時; 'time') / toki / kai (貝; 'a shell') / kai / koi (恋; 'love') / koi / kui (杭; 'a stake') / kɯi / natsu (夏; 'summer') / natsɯ / kyū (九; 'nine') / kjɯR / zō (象; 'an elephant') / zoR / kin (金; 'gold') / kiN /	mimi ga (耳が) / mimi ɡa / toki ga (時が) / toki ɡa / kai ga (貝が) / kai ɡa / koi ga (恋が) / koi ɡa / kui ga (杭が) / kɯi ɡa / natsu ga (夏) / natsɯ ɡa / kyū ga (九が) / kjɯR ɡa / zō ga (象が) / zoR ɡa / kin ga (金が) / kiN ɡa / abura (油; 'oil') / abɯɾa / namida (涙; 'a tear') / namida /	abura ga (油が) / abɯɾa ɡa / namida ga (涙が) / namida ɡa /	

Just like in the Tokyo dialect, there is initial lowering in bimoraic or longer phrases, and "final accent" can only be realized as "medial accent" before a particle or auxiliary.

Among accented bimoraic nouns, those ending in one of the close vowels /i, ɯ/ or special morae /R, N/ are more likely initial-accented, while those ending in anything else are more likely final-accented. There was probably a historical change that turned initial-accented bimoraic nouns ending in anything other than /i, ɯ, R, N/ into final-accented ones. Outliers such as kiku (菊; 'a florist's daisy') / ki̥kɯ /, kutsu (靴; 'a shoe') / kɯ̥tsɯ /, tsuki (月; 'the moon') / tsɯ̥ki /, tsuchi (土; 'dirt') / tsɯ̥cɕi /, fuku (服; 'a garment') / ɸɯ̥kɯ /, etc can be accounted for by rightward accent shifts away from devoiced vowels; and koe (声; 'a voice') / koe / and mae (前; 'the front') / mae / are thought to have been / koi / and / mai /, but the original final vowel /i/ somehow became /e/ like in Tokyo Japanese.

Verbal and adjectival imperfect conclusives tend to be minimally penultimate accented, with possible leftward shifts like in Tokyo verbs (see Japanese pitch accent rules (verbs and adjectives) § Verbs). Most bimoraic imperfect attributives are unaccented, while most trimoraic ones are accented just like conclusives.

	Imperfect conclusives	Imperfect attributives
Bimoraic verbs	kiru (着る; 'wears'): / kiɾɯ /	kiru toki (着る時; 'when one wears'): / kiɾɯ toki /
Bimoraic verbs	oku (置く; 'puts'): / okɯ /	oku toki (置く時; 'when one puts'): / okɯ toki /
Bimoraic verbs	kuru (来る; 'comes'): / kɯɾɯ /	kuru toki (来る時; 'when one comes'): / kɯɾɯ | toki ~ kɯɾɯ toki /
Bimoraic verbs	oru (居る; 'exists'): / oɾɯ /	oru toki (居る時; 'when one exists'): / oɾɯ | toki ~ oɾɯ toki /
Trimoraic verbs	kariru (借りる; 'borrows'): / kaɾiɾɯ /	kariru toki (借りる時; 'when one borrows'): / kaɾiɾɯ | toki /
Trimoraic verbs	hairu (入る; 'enters'): / haiɾɯ /	hairu toki (入る時; 'when one enters'): / haiɾɯ | toki /
Bimoraic adjectives	ī (良い; 'is good'): / iR /	ī toki (良い時; 'when one is good'): / iR toki /
Bimoraic adjectives	nai (無い; 'is nonexistent'): / nai /	nai toki (無い時; 'when one is nonexistent'): / nai toki /
Bimoraic adjectives	koi (濃い; 'is concentrated'): / koi /	koi toki (濃い時; 'when it is concentrated'): / koi | toki /
Bimoraic adjectives	ui (憂い; 'is wretched'): / ɯi /	ui toki (憂い時; 'when it is wretched'): / ɯi | toki /
Trimoraic adjectives	akai (赤い; 'is red'): / akai /	akai toki (赤い時; 'when one is red'): / akai | toki /

=== Shizukuishi accent ===
The Shizukuishi dialect of Iwate Prefecture features the ascending nucleus which follows a contrastive accentual rise. The patterns can be summarized as follows:

Pattern	Unimoraic	Bimoraic	Trimoraic	Quadrimoraic		Quinquemoraic		
Unaccented	μ	μμ	μμμ	μμμμ		μμμμμ		
Unaccented	ka (蚊; 'a mosquito') /ka/	ka ga (蚊が) /ka ɡa/ kaze (風; 'wind') /kaze/	kaze ga (風が) /kaze ɡa/ sakana (魚; 'a fish') /sakana/	sakana ga (魚が) /sakana ɡa/ niwatori (鶏; 'a chicken') /niwatoɾi/		niwatori ga (鶏が) /niwatoɾi ɡa/		
Final-accented	none	μμ	μμμ	μμμμ		μμμμμ		
Final-accented	none	yama (山; 'a mountain') / jama /	otoko (男; 'a male person') / otoko /	otōto (弟; 'a younger brother') / otoRto /				
Medial-accented	none		μμμ	μμμμ	μμμμ	μμμμμ	μμμμμ	μμμμμ
Medial-accented	none		yama ga (山が) / jama ɡa / kokoro (心; 'a heart') / kokoɾo /	kokoro ga (心が) / kokoɾo ɡa / murasaki (紫; 'purple') / mɯɾasaki /	otoko ga (男が) / otoko ga / karakasa (唐傘; 'a bamboo-framed, oil-papered umbrella') / kaɾakasa /	murasaki ga (紫が) / mɯɾasaki ɡa /	karakasa ga (唐傘が) / kaɾakasa ɡa /	otōto ga (弟が) / otoRto ɡa /
Initial-accented	μ	μμ	μμμ	μμμμ		μμμμμ		
Initial-accented	te (手; 'a hand') / te /	te ga (手が) / te ɡa / saru (猿; 'a monkey') / saɾɯ /	saru ga (猿が) / saɾɯ ɡa / kabuto (兜) / kabɯto /	kabuto ga (兜が) / kabɯto ɡa / kosumosu (コスモス; 'cosmos') / kosɯmosɯ /		kosumosu ga (コスモスが) / kosɯmosɯ ɡa /		

Unaccented phrases have a low tone from start to end. Only accented phrases have a high tone.

There is a fall in pitch that can occur immediately after the nucleus. If there is no room for it, it simply occurs within the nucleus, as shown in / te /, / jama /, etc. This fall is not contrastive and only surfaces in the last minor phrase of a major phrase:

- ka to kaze to sakana to niwatori (蚊と風と魚と鶏; 'a mosquito, wind, a fish and a chicken'): /ka to | kaze to | sakana to | niwatoɾi/
- te to saru to kabuto to kosumosu (手と猿と兜とコスモス; 'a hand, a monkey, a kabuto and a cosmos'): / te to | saɾɯ to | kabɯto to | kosɯmosɯ ~ te to ‖ saɾɯ to ‖ kabɯto to ‖ kosɯmosɯ /
- yama to kokoro to murasaki (山と心と紫; 'a mountain, a heart and purple'): / jama to | kokoɾo to | mɯɾasaki ~ jama to ‖ kokoɾo to ‖ mɯɾasaki /
- otoko to karakasa to otōto (男と唐傘と弟; 'a male person, an oil-paper umbrella and a younger brother'): / otoko to | kaɾakasa to | otoRto ~ otoko to ‖ kaɾakasa to ‖ otoRto /
- kabuto to sakana to otoko to kokoro (兜と魚と男と心; 'a kabuto, a fish, a male person and a heart'): / kabɯto to | sakana to | otoko to | kokoɾo ~ kabɯto to ‖ sakana to ‖ otoko to ‖ kokoɾo /

The accent pattern of a modifier–head compound noun is determined by its modifier:

- Unaccented modifier → unaccented compound:
  - sara + mawashi → saramawashi (皿+回し→皿回し; 'a plate + spinning → plate spinning'): /saɾa + mawaɕi → saɾa-mawaɕi/
  - dobu + nezumi → dobunezumi (溝+鼠→溝鼠; 'a sewer + a murid → a sewer rat'): /dobɯ + nezɯmi → dobɯ-nezɯmi/
- Accented modifier → accented compound:
  - saru + mawashi → sarumawashi (猿+回し→猿回し; 'a monkey + spinning → street monkey performance'): / saɾɯ + mawaɕi → saɾɯ-mawaɕi /
  - hari + nezumi → harinezumi (針+鼠→針鼠; 'a needle + a murid → a hedgehog'): / haɾi + nezɯmi → haɾi-nezɯmi /

=== Hirosaki accent ===
The Hirosaki or Tsugaru dialect of Aomori Prefecture also has the ascending nucleus. The patterns can be summarized as follows:

Pattern	Unimoraic	Bimoraic	Trimoraic	Quadrimoraic		Quinquemoraic		
Unaccented	μ	μμ	μμμ	μμμμ		μμμμμ		
Unaccented	ka (蚊; 'a mosquito') / ka / e (柄; 'a handle') / e /	ka ga (蚊が) / ka ɡa / e mo (柄も) / e mo / kaze (風; 'wind') / kaze /	kaze ga (風が) / kaze ɡa / sakana (魚; 'a fish') / sakana / kodomo (子供; 'a child') / kodomo / yanagi (柳; 'willow') / janaɡi /	sakana ga (魚が) / sakana ɡa / kodomo mo (子供も) / kodomo mo / yanagi mo (柳も) / janaɡi mo / niwatori (鶏; 'a chicken') / niwatoɾi / take no ko (筍; 'a bamboo shoot') / take no ko /		niwatori ga (鶏が) / niwatoɾi ɡa / take no ko mo (筍も) / take no ko mo /		
Final-accented	none	μμ	μμμ	μμμμ		μμμμμ		
Final-accented	none	yama (山; 'a mountain') / jama /	otoko (男; 'a male person') / otoko / kagami (鏡; 'a mirror') / kaɡami / namida (涙; 'a tear') / namida /	otōto (弟; 'a younger brother') / otoRto / kanzume (缶詰; 'canned provisions') / kaNzɯme / kotowaza (諺; 'a saying') / kotowaza /				
Medial-accented	none		μμμ	μμμμ	μμμμ	μμμμμ	μμμμμ	μμμμμ
Medial-accented	none		yama ga (山が) / jama ɡa / kokoro (心; 'a heart') / kokoɾo / ayame (菖蒲; 'Iris sanguinea') / ajame / otona (大人; 'an adult person') / otona /	kokoro ga (心が) / kokoɾo ɡa / ayame mo (菖蒲も) / ajame mo / otona mo (大人も) / otona mo / murasaki (紫; 'purple') / mɯɾasaki / onigiri (御握り) / oniɡiɾi /	otoko ga (男が) / otoko ga / kagami mo (鏡も) / kaɡami mo / namida mo (涙も) / namida mo / karakasa (唐傘; 'a bamboo-framed, oil-papered umbrella') / kaɾakasa / kudamono (果物; 'fruit') / kɯdamono / kirimochi (切り餅; 'a square-cut mochi') / kiɾimocɕi /	murasaki ga (紫が) / mɯɾasaki ɡa / onigiri mo (御握りも) / oniɡiɾi mo /	karakasa ga (唐傘が) / kaɾakasa ɡa / kudamono mo (果物も) / kɯdamono mo / kirimochi mo (切り餅も) / kiɾimocɕi mo /	otōto ga (弟が) / otoRto ɡa / kanzume mo (缶詰も) / kaNzɯme mo / kotowaza mo (諺も) / kotowaza mo /
Initial-accented	μ	μμ	μμμ	μμμμ		μμμμμ		
Initial-accented	te (手; 'a hand') / te / e (絵; 'an illustration') / e /	te ga (手が) / te ɡa / e mo (絵も) / e mo / saru (猿; 'a monkey') / saɾɯ /	saru ga (猿が) / saɾɯ ɡa / kabuto (兜) / kabɯto / kujira (鯨; 'a whale') / kɯʑiɾa / ichigo (苺; 'a strawberry') / icɕiɡo /	kabuto ga (兜が) / kabɯto ɡa / kujira mo (鯨も) / kɯʑiɾa mo / ichigo mo (苺も) / icɕiɡo mo / kosumosu (コスモス; 'cosmos') / kosɯmosɯ / kazu no ko (数の子; 'herring roe') / kazɯ no ko / mitsubachi (蜜蜂; 'a honeybee') / mitsɯbacɕi /		kosumosu ga (コスモスが) / kosɯmosɯ ɡa / kazu no ko mo (数の子も) / kazɯ no ko mo / mitsubachi mo (蜜蜂も) / mitsɯbacɕi mo /		

An unaccented phrase ends with a pitch rise, and its last mora can be characterized as either "high" or "mid". An unaccented unimoraic phrase does not have room for any low tone before the high, and therefore simply bears a high tone throughout. The high tone on an unaccented noun can shift rightward as the noun gets longer, but it stops when it reaches a particle and does not shift further.

An accented phrase has non-contrastive lowering at the end, which is the inverse of initial lowering in Tokyo accent. Final-accented phrases and initial-accented unimoraic phrases do not have room for a full lowering, and instead compress it within the last mora. High tones are spread from the nucleus all the way to the start of this lowering.

=== Narada accent ===
The isolated Narada dialect of Yamanashi Prefecture features the raising nucleus which precedes a contrastive accentual rise. The patterns can be summarized as follows:

Pattern	Unimoraic	Bimoraic	Trimoraic	Quadrimoraic		Quinquemoraic		
Unaccented	μ	μμ	μμμ	μμμμ		μμμμμ		
Unaccented	ka (蚊; 'a mosquito') / ka /	ka ga (蚊が) / ka ɡa / kaze (風; 'wind') / kaze /	kaze ga (風が) / kaze ɡa / sakana (魚; 'a fish') / sakana /	sakana ga (魚が) / sakana ɡa / niwatori (鶏; 'a chicken') / niwatoɾi /		niwatori ga (鶏が) / niwatoɾi ɡa /		
Final-accented	none	μμ	μμμ	μμμμ		μμμμμ		
Final-accented	none	yama (山; 'a mountain') / jama /	otoko (男; 'a male person') / otoko /	otōto (弟; 'a younger brother') / otoRto /				
Medial-accented	none		μμμ	μμμμ	μμμμ	μμμμμ	μμμμμ	μμμμμ
Medial-accented	none		yama ga (山が) / jama ɡa / kokoro (心; 'a heart') / kokoɾo /	kokoro ga (心が) / kokoɾo ɡa / asagao (朝顔; 'picotee morning glory') / asaɡao /	otoko ga (男が) / otoko ɡa / karakasa (唐傘; 'a bamboo-framed, oil-papered umbrella') / kaɾakasa /	asagao ga (朝顔が) / asaɡao ɡa /	karakasa ga (唐傘が) / kaɾakasa ɡa /	otōto ga (弟が) / otoRto ɡa /
Initial-accented	μ	μμ	μμμ	μμμμ		μμμμμ		
Initial-accented	te (手; 'a hand') / te /	te ga (手が) / te ɡa / saru (猿; 'a monkey') / saɾɯ /	saru ga (猿が) / saɾɯ ɡa / kabuto (兜) / kabɯto /	kabuto ga (兜が) / kabɯto ɡa / kōmori (蝙蝠; 'a bat') / koRmoɾi /		kōmori ga (蝙蝠が) / koRmoɾi ɡa /		

If the first mora is not the nucleus, it automatically bears a high tone and precedes a pitch fall (compare #Initial lowering). Unlike in other dialects, the nucleus bears a low tone, but only if there is enough room for the following accentual rise to be realized, in other words only in a bimoraic or longer phrase; if there is not, ie in a unimoraic phrase, the nucleus bears a high tone, which means an accented unimoraic phrase is indistinguishable from an unaccented one, as is the case in Tokyo accent. Likewise, an unaccented phrase is indistinguishable from a final-accented one, and "final accent" can only be realized as "medial accent" with a following particle or auxiliary. The nucleus precedes an accentual rise (low to high), which in turn precedes an accentual fall (high to low); thus, a third-accented quadrimoraic phrase would have an undulating contour in the form of high-low-high-low.

Contours in Narada accent are virtually inverse to contours in Tokyo accent. In the following comparison table, H stands for "high" and L for "low"; the example nouns have the same pattern types and nucleus locations (in bold) in both dialects:

Noun phrase	Narada contour	Tokyo contour
/niwatoɾi/	HLLL	LHHH
/niwatoɾi ɡa/	HLLLL	LHHHH
/otoR**to**/	HLLL	LHHH
/otoR**to** ɡa/	HLLLH	LHHHL
/a**sa**ɡao/	HLHL	LHLL
/a**sa**ɡao ɡa/	HLHLL	LHLLL
/kaɾa**ka**sa/	HLLH	LHHL
/kaɾa**ka**sa ɡa/	HLLHL	LHHLL
/**ko**Rmoɾi/	LHLL	HLLL
/**ko**Rmoɾi ɡa/	LHLLL	HLLLL

== Kyoto–Osaka-style accent ==
Unlike in Tokyo-style (n+1) dialects where only the presence and location of the nucleus are contrastive, many dialects in Kansai and Shikoku also make use of contrastive tonal registers (式, shiki; lit. 'style'), which are the general trajectories of phrasal contours. Registers in these dialects are analogously contrastive to contour tones in Chinese, except that their domain is an entire phrase, not just a single syllable. The register- and nucleus-based systems have been termed Kyoto–Osaka systems (京阪式アクセント, Keihanshiki akusento) or, more inclusively, central systems (中央式アクセント, chūōshiki akusento).

There are three main registers (the following describes the general trajectories which can be modified by nuclei):

- High-falling (下降式, kakōshiki; lit. 'descending style'): the contour starts high and gradually declines to the end (compare the aforementioned declination in Tokyo contours).
- High-level (不下降式, fukakōshiki; lit. 'non-descending style'): the contour starts high and remains evenly high to the end.
- Low-rising (上昇式, jōshōshiki; lit. 'ascending style'): the contour starts low and gradually rises to end.

=== Kyoto accent ===

Kyoto accent involves two registers, high-falling and low-rising. For simplicity, they will be henceforth referred to as "high" and "low" for short, disregarding the gradual fall and rise. The patterns of Kyoto accent can be summarized as follows:

Register	Pattern	Bimoraic	Trimoraic	Quadrimoraic		Quinquemoraic		
High	Unaccented	μμ	μμμ	μμμμ		μμμμμ		
High	Unaccented	hī (杼; 'a shuttle') / hiR / tō (戸; 'a door') / toR / ame (飴; 'candy') / ame / mizu (水; 'water') / mizu / tori (鳥; 'a bird') / toɾi /	hī ga (杼が) / hiR ɡa / tō ga (戸が) / toR ɡa / kodomo (子供; 'a child') / kodomo / ohen (おへん; 'doesn't exist') / oheN /	kamaboko (蒲鉾) / kamaboko / Amerika (アメリカ; 'America') / ameɾika /				
High	Medial-accented	none	μμμ	μμμμ	μμμμ	μμμμμ	μμμμμ	μμμμμ
High	Medial-accented	none	Onoshi (小野氏; 'Mr Ono') / onoɕi / kimira (君等; 'you guys') / kimiɾa /	doromizu (泥水; 'muddy water') / doɾomizu / kimitachi (君達; 'you guys') / kimitacɕi /	kanemochi (金持ち; 'a rich person') / kanemocɕi / Ayabeshi (綾部市; 'Ayabe City') / ajabeɕi /			
High	Medial-accented	none		unchin (運賃; 'a fare') / uNcɕiN / enbun (塩分; 'salt content') / eNbuN / ondori (雄鶏; 'a rooster') / oNdoɾi /				
High	Medial-accented	none		ōkaze (大風; 'a gale') / oRkaze / jūgyō (十行; 'ten lines of text') / ʑuRɡjoR /			urūdoshi (閏年; 'a rooster') / uɾuRdoɕi /	
High	Medial-accented	none		kainushi (飼い主; 'a pet owner') / kainuɕi /				
High	Initial-accented	μμ	μμμ	μμμμ		μμμμμ		
High	Initial-accented	hī (日; 'a day') / hiR / hā (歯; 'a tooth') / haR / ami (網; 'a net') / ami / yama (山; 'a mountain') / jama /	hī ga (日が) / hiR ɡa / hā ga (歯が) / haR ɡa / otoko (男; 'a male person') / otoko / inochi (命; 'life') / inocɕi / shiran (知らん; 'hasn't gotten to know') / ɕiɾaN /	asagao (朝顔; 'picotee morning glory') / asaɡao / kosumosu (コスモス; 'cosmos') / kosumosu /				
Low	Unaccented	μμ	μμμ	μμμμ		μμμμμ		
Low	Unaccented	hī (火; 'a fire') / hiR / mē (目; 'an eye') / meR / hune (船; 'a watercraft') / hune /	hī ga (火が) / hiR ɡa / mē ga (目が) / meR ɡa / suzume (雀; 'a Eurasian tree sparrow') / suzume /	shirogumi (白組; 'the white team') / ɕiɾoɡumi / ohanashi (御話; 'a story, politely speaking') / ohanaɕi /				
Low	Final-accented	μμ	μμμ	none				
Low	Final-accented	ame (雨; 'rain') / ame / saru (猿; 'a monkey') / saɾu /	osaki (御先; 'what comes next') / osaki / matchi (マッチ; 'a match') / maQcɕi /	none				
Low	Medial-accented	none	μμμ	μμμμ	μμμμ	μμμμμ	μμμμμ	μμμμμ
Low	Medial-accented	none	ame ga (雨が) / ame ɡa ~ ame ɡa / saru ga (猿が) / saɾu ɡa ~ saɾu ɡa / hatake (畑; 'a plantation') / hatake /	tachibana (橘) / tacɕibana /	osaki ni (御先に) / osaki ni ~ osaki ni / matchi ga (マッチが) / maQcɕi ɡa ~ maQcɕi ɡa / takenoko (筍; 'a bamboo shoot') / takenoko / sansaro (三叉路; 'a three-way junction') / saNsaɾo /			
Low	Medial-accented	none	Indo (印度; 'India') / iNdo /	endan (縁談; 'talks about a prospective marriage') / eNdaN / sankai (三回; 'three times') / saNkai /				
Low	Medial-accented	none	Chūka (中華; 'China') / cɕuRka /	chūō (中央; 'the center') / cɕuRoR / shōjin (精進; 'devotion') / ɕoRʑiN /				
Low	Medial-accented	none		kaikē (会計; 'the accounts') / kaikeR / saichū (最中; 'the exact middle') / saicɕuR / daikin (代金; 'the cost') / daikiN /				

The high-registered contour starts high on the first mora and stays high all the way to either the last mora or the nucleus. The low-registered contour starts low on the first mora and stays low all the way to the start of a high tone on either the last mora or the nucleus.

The tone-bearing unit is the mora. Words that are otherwise unimoraic in other dialects are lengthened with /R/. Unlike in Tokyo Japanese, special morae are capable of being accent nuclei in Kyoto Japanese.

Given that Kyoto Japanese has contrastive registers and nuclei, the number of possible patterns for a given noun is hypothetically 2n+2, twice that in Tokyo Japanese. In actuality, there are no known high-registered final-accented nouns, nor low-registered final-accented quadrimoraic or longer nouns, nor low-registered initial-accented nouns (which would involve a rising tone on the first mora, although such nouns used to exist in the Kyoto dialect of the Heian period); therefore, the number of possibilities is more like 2n−1, but only for quadrimoraic or longer nouns.

A low-registered unaccented phrase has a high tone on its last mora, even if that mora is special; however, this high tone is not a nuclear high, and it is mobile and shifts rightward as more particles and auxiliaries are added. Low-registered unaccented words also maintain their high tone before another low-registered word, but lose it before a high-registered one.

- suzume (雀; 'a Eurasian tree sparrow'): / suzume /
  - → suzume kau (雀飼う; 'rears a sparrow'): / suzume | kau /
  - → suzume kawaigaru (雀可愛がる; 'dotes on a sparrow'): / suzume | kawaiɡaɾu /
  - → suzume o (雀を): / suzume o /
    - → suzume o kau (雀を飼う; 'rears a sparrow'): / suzume o | kau /
    - → suzume o kawaigaru (雀を可愛がる; 'dotes on a sparrow'): / suzume o | kawaiɡaɾu /

There are few final-accented nouns, most of which are low-registered and bimoraic. Unlike in Tokyo Japanese where a final accentual fall can only be realized before a particle or auxiliary, it is realized in Kyoto Japanese on the last mora as a falling tone; however, once a particle or auxiliary is added, there is room for the accentual fall to alternatively straddle two morae instead of just one. Final-accented words otherwise retain their nuclear falling tone before non-particle words. However, there is an ongoing change in Kyoto in particular and Kansai in general, primarily among Kansaians born since 1960, that is merging final-accented and unaccented words in the low register, although this change is yet to affect all words. Compare the traditionally final-accented saru and the traditionally unaccented hune (innovative contours are listed after rightward arrows):

- saru (猿; 'a monkey'): / saɾu → saɾu /
  - → saru kau (猿飼う; 'rears a monkey'): / saɾu | kau → saɾu | kau /
  - → saru kawaigaru (猿可愛がる; 'dotes on a monkey'): / saɾu | kawaiɡaɾu → saɾu | kawaiɡaɾu /
  - → saru ga (猿が): / saɾu ɡa ~ saɾu ɡa /
- hune (船; 'a watercraft'): / hune /
  - → hune kuru (船来る; 'a watercraft comes'): / hune | kuɾu /
  - → hune morau (船貰う; 'receives a watercraft'): / hune | moɾau /
  - → hune ga (船が): / hune ɡa → hune ɡa /

While nouns have many possible contours, verbs are generally unaccented:

- High-registered: kiru (着る; 'wears') / kiɾu /, sū (吸う; 'inhales') / suR /, kureru (暮れる; '[the sun] sets') / kuɾeɾu /, hashiru (走る; 'runs') / haɕiɾu /, morau (貰う; 'receives') / moɾau /, midareru (乱れる; 'gets chaotic') / midaɾeɾu /, kawaigaru (可愛がる; 'dotes on') / kawaiɡaɾu /, etc.
- Low-registered: kau (飼う; 'rears') / kau /, kuru (来る; 'comes') / kuɾu /, miru (見る; 'views') / miɾu /, yomu (読む; 'reads') / jomu /, ochiru (落ちる; 'falls') / ocɕiɾu /, aruku (歩く; 'walks') / aɾuku /, kakaeru (抱える; 'holds with the arms') / kakaeɾu /, etc.

Adjectives tend to be high-registered and minimally antepenultimate-accented if their mora counts permit:

- Bimoraic: koi (濃い; 'is concentrated') / koi /, sui (酸い; 'is sour') / sui /
  - But: yoi → ē (良い→ええ; 'is good') / joi → eR /, nai (無い; 'is nonexistent') / nai /
- Trimoraic or longer: akai (赤い; 'is red') / akai /, tanoshī (楽しい; 'is merry') / tanoɕiR /, omoshiroi (面白い; 'is delightful') / omoɕiɾoi /, etc.

Recent loanwords often have the same location for their nuclei, which is assumed to be the antepenultimate mora, in Kyoto and Tokyo Japanese. However, despite allowing special morae to be nuclei, Kyoto Japanese tends to avoid that in recent loanwords, which means a nucleus can also be the preantepenultimate mora (see also #Accent shifts). Registers, on the other hand, are still unpredictable.

Mora count	Recent-loanword noun	Kyoto contour	Tokyo contour
3	doresu (ドレス; 'a dress')	/ doɾesu /	/ doɾesɯ /
3	batā (バター; 'butter')	/ bataR /	
3	purin (プリン; 'pudding')	/ puɾiN /	/ pɯɾiN /
3	Perusha (ペルシャ; 'Persia')	/ peɾuɕa /	/ peɾɯɕa /
3	miruku (ミルク; 'milk')	/ miɾuku /	/ miɾɯkɯ /
3	tomato (トマト)	/ tomato ~ tomato /	/ tomato /
4	toraburu (トラブル; 'trouble')	/ toɾabuɾu /	/ toɾabɯɾɯ /
4	orenji (オレンジ; 'orange')	/ oɾeNʑi ~ oɾeNʑi /	/ oɾeNʑi /
4	shanpū (シャンプー; 'shampoo')	/ ɕaNpuR /	/ ɕaNpɯR /
4	Bankoku (バンコク; 'Bangkok')	/ baNkoku /	/ baNkokɯ /
4	Rondon (ロンドン; 'London')	/ ɾoNdoN /	
4	pīman (ピーマン; 'a bell pepper')	/ piRmaN /	
5	arubaito (アルバイト; 'a part-time job')	/ aɾubaito ~ aɾubaito /	/ aɾɯbaito /
5	interia (インテリア; 'an interior')	/ iNteɾia ~ iNteɾia /	/ iNteɾia ~ iNteɾia /
5	pianisuto (ピアニスト; 'a pianist')	/ pianisuto /	/ pianisɯto /
5	komāsharu (コマーシャル; 'a commercial')	/ komaRɕaɾu /	/ komaRɕaɾɯ /
5	dezainā (デザイナー; 'a designer')	/ dezainaR /	
5	Washinton (ワシントン; 'Washington')	/ waɕiNtoN /	
6	Rosanzerusu (ロサンゼルス; 'Los Angeles')	/ ɾosaNzeɾusu /	/ ɾosaNzeɾɯsɯ /
6	erebētā (エレベーター; 'an elevator')	/ eɾebeRtaR ~ eɾebeRtaR /	/ eɾebeRtaR /
7	esukarētā (エスカレーター; 'an escalator')	/ esukaɾeRtaR ~ esukaɾeRtaR /	/ esɯkaɾeRtaR /
7	komyunikēshon (コミュニケーション; 'communication')	/ komjunikeRɕoN ~ komjunikeRɕoN /	/ komjɯnikeRɕoN /

Quadrimoraic clipped compounds tend to be unaccented in both Kyoto and Tokyo Japanese. They tend to be in the low register.

Clipped compound	Kyoto contour	Tokyo contour
gakushoku (学食; 'a school cafeteria')	/ ɡakuɕoku /	/ ɡakɯɕokɯ /
gakuwari (学割; 'a student discount')	/ ɡakuwaɾi /	/ ɡakɯwaɾi /
rusuden (留守電; 'an answerphone')	/ ɾusudeN ~ ɾusudeN /	/ ɾɯsɯdeN /
aruchū (アル中; 'alcohol poisoning')	/ aɾucɕuR /	/ aɾɯcɕɯR /
sekuhara (セクハラ; 'sexual harassment')	/ sekuhaɾa /	/ sekɯhaɾa /
pansuto (パンスト; 'pantyhose')	/ paNsuto /	/ paNsɯto ~ paNsɯto /
rimokon (リモコン; 'a remote')	/ ɾimokoN /	/ ɾimokoN /

==== Particles and auxiliaries ====
Particles and auxiliaries can be put into five groups based on their interactions with preceding words (asterisked particles and auxiliaries belong to more than one group):

Group					Dependent	Low	Independent	Dominant	Special
Group					Bears whatever tone of the preceding word's last mora.	Bears a low tone even after an unaccented word.	Has its own nucleus surface or is suppressed by an accented word.	Overrides the preceding word's nucleus.	1. Attributive particle: Generally dependent. Optionally deaccents high-registered and formerly penultimate-accented nouns that are now initial-accented. Low after a few unaccented nouns.; 2. Noun-clause nominalizer: Generally low. Optionally overrides high-registered and formerly penultimate-accented nouns that are now initial-accented.
Members		Particles			ga (nominative), de (instrumental; locative), to (comitative; conditional; enumerative), ni, wa (は), ya (conclusive), wa* (わ), o; ↗ka (genuinely interrogative), ka* (self-directedly interrogative); (↗)e (え); kara	i, e (へ), ga (concessive), shi, na, mo, ya (enumerative; before nai and ohen), yo, wa* (わ); te, to (quotative); ka* (self-directedly interrogative; rhetorically interrogative; before wakaran, shiran, etc); (↗)ze, (↗)zo, (↗)de (conclusive); koso*, sae*, shika, made*, yara, yori; o shi* ~ yo shi, o na; no(n) ~ n (verb and adjective nominalizer), no de; ga na, to ka, na to; ya n	dake / dake /, nari* / naɾi /, mama / mama /; kate / kate /, koso* / koso /, sae* / sae /; nā / naR /, nē / neR /; wā (わあ) / waR /, wa i (わい) / wa i /; ka i / ka i /, ka mo / ka mo /, de mo / de mo /; kurai* / kuɾai / ~ gurai* / ɡuɾai /; sakai / sakai / ~ sake / sake /; ke(n)do / ke(N)do /; o shi* / o ɕi /; made* / made /; ka nā / ka naR /; bakkari* / baQkaɾi /	nari* / naɾi /; kurai* / kuɾai / ~ gurai* / ɡuɾai /	no(n) (attributive)
Members		Auxiliaries			dosu	ya, yaro*, yatta; beshi	sō / soR /, yō / joR /; mitai / mitai /; yaro* / jaɾo /; doshita / doɕita /; rashī* / ɾaɕiR /	rashī* / ɾaɕiR /	
Examples	High-registered	Unaccented	kodomo (子供; 'a child')	/ kodomo /	/ kodomo ɡa /	/ kodomo mo /	/ kodomo jaɾo /	/ kodomo ɡuɾai /	/ kodomo no /
Examples	High-registered	Medial-accented	Onoshi (小野氏; 'Mr Ono')	/ onoɕi /	/ onoɕi ɡa /	/ onoɕi mo /	/ onoɕi | jaɾo ~ onoɕi jaɾo /	/ onoɕi ɡuɾai /	/ onoɕi no /
Examples	High-registered	Initial-accented	otoko (男; 'a male person')	/ otoko /	/ otoko ɡa /	/ otoko mo /	/ otoko | jaɾo ~ otoko jaɾo /	/ otoko ɡuɾai /	1. / otoko no ~ otoko no /; 2. / otoko no ~ otoko no /
Examples	Low-registered	Unaccented	suzume (雀; 'a Eurasian tree sparrow')	/ suzume /	/ suzume ɡa /	/ suzume mo /	/ suzume | jaɾo /	/ suzume | ɡuɾai /	/ suzume no /
Examples	Low-registered	Final-accented	matchi (マッチ; 'a match')	/ maQcɕi /	/ maQcɕi ɡa ~ maQcɕi ɡa /	/ maQcɕi mo ~ maQcɕi mo /	/ maQcɕi | jaɾo ~ maQcɕi jaɾo ~ maQcɕi jaɾo /	/ maQcɕi | ɡuɾai /	/ maQcɕi no ~ maQcɕi no /
Examples	Low-registered	Medial-accented	hatake (畑; 'a plantation')	/ hatake /	/ hatake ɡa /	/ hatake mo /	/ hatake | jaɾo ~ hatake jaɾo /	/ hatake | ɡuɾai /	/ hatake no /

Dos sharo, a contraction of dosu yaro, contains the dependent dos part and the independent sharo part.

Particles and auxiliaries generally do not change their behaviors when following other particles and auxiliaries, although when a bimoraic or longer low particle is followed by another low particle, the former's last mora may alternatively bear a high tone. The dependent particle wa (は) may be low after another dependent particle among younger speakers. When a dominant particle or auxiliary follows an independent one, the former dominates the latter, but not the noun phrase before it.

	tori (鳥; 'a bird')	yama (山; 'a mountain')
	/ toɾi /	/ jama /
Dependent + dependent	/ toɾi ni wa ~ toɾi ni wa /	/ jama ni wa /
Dependent + dependent	/ toɾi ni dosu /	/ jama ni dosu /
Dependent + dependent	/ toɾi kaɾa wa /	/ jama kaɾa wa /
Dependent + dependent	/ toɾi kaɾa dosu /	/ jama kaɾa dosu /
Dependent + low	/ toɾi ni mo /	/ jama ni mo /
Dependent + low	/ toɾi ni made /	/ jama ni made /
Dependent + low	/ toɾi kaɾa mo /	/ jama kaɾa mo /
Dependent + low	/ toɾi kaɾa made /	/ jama kaɾa made /
Dependent + independent	/ toɾi ni doɕita /	/ jama ni | doɕita ~ jama ni doɕita /
Dependent + independent	/ toɾi kaɾa doɕita /	/ jama kaɾa | doɕita ~ jama kaɾa doɕita /
Dependent + independent + dominant	/ toɾi ni | baQkaɾi | ɾaɕiR/	/ jama ni | baQkaɾi | ɾaɕiR/
Dependent + dominant	/ toɾi ni ɾaɕiR /	/ jama ni ɾaɕiR /
Low + dependent	/ toɾi e wa /	/ jama e wa /
Low + dependent	/ toɾi e dosu /	/ jama e dosu /
Low + dependent	/ toɾi joɾi wa /	/ jama joɾi wa /
Low + dependent	/ toɾi joɾi dosu /	/ jama joɾi dosu /
Low + low	/ toɾi e mo /	/ jama e mo /
Low + low	/ toɾi e made /	/ jama e made /
Low + low	/ toɾi joɾi mo ~ toɾi | joɾi mo /	/ jama joɾi mo ~ jama | joɾi mo /
Low + low	/ toɾi joɾi made ~ toɾi | joɾi made /	/ jama joɾi made ~ jama | joɾi made /
Low + independent	/ toɾi e | doɕita ~ toɾi e doɕita /	/ jama e | doɕita ~ jama e doɕita /
Low + independent	/ toɾi joɾi | doɕita ~ toɾi joɾi doɕita /	/ jama joɾi | doɕita ~ jama joɾi doɕita /
Low + dominant	/ toɾi mo ɾaɕiR /	/ jama mo ɾaɕiR /
Independent + dependent	/ toɾi ɾaɕiR to /	/ jama | ɾaɕiR to ~ jama ɾaɕiR to /
Independent + low	/ toɾi ɾaɕiR ɕi /	/ jama | ɾaɕiR ɕi ~ jama ɾaɕiR ɕi /
Independent + low	/ toɾi ɾaɕiR no de /	/ jama | ɾaɕiR no de ~ jama ɾaɕiR no de /
Independent + independent	/ toɾi ɾaɕiR | kedo ~ toɾi ɾaɕiR kedo /	/ jama | ɾaɕiR | kedo ~ jama | ɾaɕiR kedo ~ jama ɾaɕiR kedo /

==== Compounds ====
Modifier–head compound nouns that are long (with at least one trimoraic or longer native or recent-loanword component, or one two-kanji-long or longer Sino-Japanese component; see Japanese pitch accent rules § Modifier–head compound nouns) are generally regular in Kyoto Japanese, just as they are in Tokyo Japanese (see Japanese pitch accent rules § Long compounds). Both Kyoto and Tokyo compounds tend to delete whatever nucleus their first component has, but Kyoto compounds do preserve its register (式保存, shikihozon), and such preservation of the first component's underlying accent type also occurs in non-register-based dialects such as Kagoshima and Shizukuishi.

Short (uni- or bimoraic) heads tend to make the modifier's last mora the nucleus:

- High-registered modifier → high-registered compound:
  - manatsu + hī → manatsubi (真夏+日→真夏日; 'midsummer + a day → a midsummer day'): / manatsu + hiR → manatsu-bi /
  - denwa + kuchi → denwaguchi (電話+口→電話口; 'a telephone + a mouth → a phone mouthpiece'): / deNwa + kucɕi → deNwa-ɡucɕi /
  - warabi + mochi → warabimochi (蕨+餅→蕨餅; 'common bracken + a mochi → a bracken mochi'): / waɾabi + mocɕi → waɾabi-mocɕi /
  - shitsuke + ito → shitsukeito (仕付け+糸→仕付け糸; 'basting + thread → basting thread'): / ɕitsuke + ito → ɕitsuke-ito /
- Low-registered modifier → low-registered compound:
  - kikoku + hī → kikokubi (帰国+日→帰国日; 'returning to one's home country + a day → the day of returning to one's home country'): / kikoku + hiR → kikoku-bi /
  - jōsha + kuchi → jōshaguchi (乗車+口→乗車口; 'boarding a land vehicle + an opening → an boarding entrance'): / ʑoRɕa + kucɕi → ʑoRɕa-ɡucɕi /
  - yomogi + mochi → yomogimochi (蓬+餅→蓬餅; 'yomogi + a mochi → a yomogi mochi'): / jomoɡi + mocɕi → jomoɡi-mocɕi /
  - shishū + ito → shishūto (刺繍+糸→刺繍糸; 'embroidery + thread → embroidery thread'): / ɕiɕuR + ito → ɕiɕuR-ito /

Tri- and quadrimoraic heads tend to make their own first mora the nucleus:

- High-registered modifier → high-registered compound:
  - nikomi + udon → nikomi udon (煮込み+饂飩→煮込み饂飩; 'stewing + udon → stewed udon'): / nikomi + udoN → nikomi udoN /
  - chikara + shigoto → chikarashigoto (力+仕事→力仕事; 'strength + work → manual labor'): / cɕikaɾa + ɕiɡoto → cɕikaɾa-ɕiɡoto /
  - shishi + odori → shishiodori (獅子+踊り→獅子踊り; 'a lion + dance → the lion dance'): / ɕiɕi + odoɾi → ɕiɕi-odoɾi /
  - mitarashi + dango → mitarashi dango (御手洗+団子→御手洗団子; 'washing hands before praying + a dango → a mitarashi dango'): / mitaɾaɕi + daNɡo → mitaɾaɕi daNɡo /
  - nishi + yokozuna → nishiyokozuna (西+横綱→西横綱; 'west + a yokozuna → a "west" yokozuna (Note: A junior yokozuna, listed in the left column of a banzuke, ranked lower than an "east" yokozuna in the right column.)'): / niɕi + jokozuna → niɕi-jokozuna /
- Low-registered modifier → low-registered compound:
  - karē + udon → karē udon (カレー+饂飩→煮込み饂飩; 'curry + udon → curry udon'): / kaɾeR + udoN → kaɾeR udoN /
  - hatake + shigoto → hatakeshigoto (畑+仕事→畑仕事; 'a plantation + work → working on a plantation'): / hatake + ɕiɡoto → hatake-ɕigoto /
  - Awa + odori → Awaodori (阿波+踊り→阿波踊り; 'Awa + dance → the Awa Dance'): / awa + odoɾi → awa-odoɾi /
  - yomogi + dango → yomogidango (蓬+団子→蓬団子; 'yomogi + a dango → a yomogi dango'): / jomoɡi + daNɡo → jomoɡi-daNɡo /
  - shin + yokozuna → shin'yokozuna (新+横綱→新横綱; 'new + a yokozuna → a new yokozuna'): / ɕiN + jokozuna → ɕiN-jokozuna /

Quinquemoraic or longer heads tend to retain their original medial accent and register:

- High-registered modifier → high-registered compound:
  - shimin + kaigishitsu → shimin kaigishitsu (市民+会議室→市民会議室; 'a citizen + a conference room → a citizen-meeting room'): / ɕimiN + kaiɡiɕitsu → ɕimiN | kaiɡiɕitsu /
  - mikan + yōguruto → mikan yōguruto (蜜柑+ヨーグルト→蜜柑ヨーグルト; 'a mandarin orange + yogurt → mandarin yogurt'): / mikaN + joRɡuɾuto → mikaN joRɡuɾuto /
- Low-registered modifier → low-registered compound:
  - chūō + kaigishitsu → chūō kaigishitsu (中央+会議室→中央会議室; 'the center + a conference room → a central conference room'): / cɕuRoR + kaiɡiɕitsu → cɕuRoR | kaiɡiɕitsu /
  - burūberī + yōguruto → burūberī yōguruto (ブルーベリー+ヨーグルト→ブルーベリーヨーグルト; 'blueberry + yogurt → blueberry yogurt'): / buɾuRbeɾiR + joRɡuɾuto → buɾuRbeɾiR | joRɡuɾuto /

As the above examples show, tri- and quadrimoraic heads do not tend to retain their medial nuclei in Kyoto compounds, only quinquemoraic and longer ones do. In contrast, medial-accented heads of all length tend to retain their nuclei in Tokyo compounds (see Japanese pitch accent rules § Long heads). Younger Kyoto speakers have a stronger tendency to adopt Tokyo-style compounds in cases of originally medial-accented tri- and quadrimoraic heads.

Just like in Tokyo Japanese, compounds with very long heads, or with the modifiers being the heads' semantic objects, and dvandva compounds, are more likely to retain the accent patterns of both components, in other words to be non-compoundified (see Japanese pitch accent rules § Non-compoundified compounds):

- tanki kaigai ryūgaku (短期海外留学; 'short-term overseas studies'): / taNki | kaiɡai ɾjuRɡaku /
- Nihon Sumō Kyōkai (日本相撲協会; 'the Japan Sumo Association'): / nihoN | sumoR kjoRkai /
- Nihon Rekishi Gakkai (日本歴史学会; 'the Japan History Society'): / nihoN | ɾekiɕi ɡaQkai /
- kakusa zesē (格差是正; 'disparity correction'): / kakusa | zeseR /
- jimusho hēsa (事務所閉鎖; 'office closure'): / ʑimuɕo | heRsa /
- Kyōto–Nara (京都・奈良): / kjoRto | naɾa /
- Indo–Pakisutan (印度・パキスタン; 'India–Pakistan'): / iNdo | pakisutaN /

=== Ibuki accent ===

Unlike the Kyoto dialect, the dialect of Ibuki Island has three registers, high-level, high-falling and low-rising. The patterns can be summarized as follows:

Register	Pattern	Unimoraic	Bimoraic	Trimoraic	Quadrimoraic		Quinquemoraic		
High-level	Unaccented	μ	μμ	μμμ	μμμμ		μμμμμ		
High-level	Unaccented	e (柄; 'a handle') / e /	e ga (柄が) / e ɡa / kaze (風; 'wind') / kaze /	kaze ga (風が) / kaze ɡa / kuruma (車; 'a car') / kuɾuma /	kuruma ga (車が) / kuɾuma ɡa / niwatori (鶏; 'a chicken') / niwatoɾi /		niwatori ga (鶏が) / niwatoɾi ɡa /		
High-level	Medial-accented	none		μμμ	μμμμ	μμμμ	μμμμμ	μμμμμ	μμμμμ
High-level	Medial-accented	none		musume (娘; 'a daughter') / musume /	musume ga (娘が) / musume ɡa / amazake (甘酒; 'sweet sake') / amazake /	kanemochi (金持ち; 'a rich person') / kanemocɕi /	amazake ga (甘酒が) / amazake ɡa /	kanemochi ga (金持ちが) / kanemocɕi ɡa /	
High-level	Initial-accented	μ	μμ	μμμ	μμμμ		μμμμμ		
High-level	Initial-accented	ha (葉; 'a leaf') / ha /	ha ga (葉が) / ha ɡa / ishi (石; 'a stone') / iɕi /	ishi ga (石が) / iɕi ɡa / chikara (力; 'strength') / cɕikaɾa /	chikara ga (力が) / cɕikaɾa ɡa / asagao (朝顔; 'picotee morning glory') / asaɡao /		asagao ga (朝顔が) / asaɡao ɡa /		
High-falling	Unaccented	none	μμ	μμμ	μμμμ		μμμμμ		
High-falling	Unaccented	none	inu (犬; 'a dog') / inu /	inu ga (犬が) / inu ɡa / atama (頭; 'a head') / atama /	atama ga (頭が) / atama ɡa / ashiato (足跡; 'a footprint') / aɕiato /		ashiato ga (足跡が) / aɕiato ɡa /		
Low-rising	Unaccented	μ	μμ	μμμ	μμμμ		μμμμμ		
Low-rising	Unaccented	te (手; 'a hand') / te /	te ga (手が) / te ɡa / hune (船; 'a watercraft') / hune /	hune ga (船が) / hune ɡa / suzume (雀; 'a Eurasian tree sparrow') / suzume /	suzume ga (雀が) / suzume ɡa / atoashi (後足; 'a hind leg') / atoaɕi /		atoashi ga (後足が) / atoaɕi ɡa /		
Low-rising	Final-accented	none	μμ	μμμ	μμμμ		μμμμμ		
Low-rising	Final-accented	none	saru (猿; 'a monkey') / saɾu /	noroma (鈍間; 'a dolt') / noɾoma /	irojiro (色白; 'fair skin') / iɾoʑiɾo /				
Low-rising	Medial-accented	none		μμμ	μμμμ	μμμμ	μμμμμ	μμμμμ	μμμμμ
Low-rising	Medial-accented	none		saru ga (猿が) / saɾu ɡa / kaiko (蚕; 'a silkworm') / kaiko /	kaiko ga (蚕が) / kaiko ɡa / kinobori (木登り; 'tree climbing') / kinoboɾi /	noroma ga (鈍間が) / noɾoma ɡa / matsutake (松茸) / matsutake /	kinobori ga (木登りが) / kinoboɾi ɡa /	matsutake ga (松茸が) / matsutake ɡa /	irojiro ga (色白が) / iɾoʑiɾo ɡa /

The high-level register is flatly high and shows no declination. The high-falling register shows declination from the third mora onward in a trimoraic or longer phase, or from the second mora in a bimoraic phrase (declination is shown as "mid" dashed lines in the above table). The low-rising register is very similar to that in Kyoto accent, in that there is a gradual rise toward a high tone. An unaccented unimoraic phrase compresses that rise within its single mora. Similarly, the accentual fall in a low-rising final-accented phrase is compressed within its last mora, and spread out more once a particle or auxiliary is added.

== N-pattern accent ==
Unlike the Tokyo dialect with its variable n+1-pattern accent, many Japanese and Ryukyuan dialects across southwestern Kyushu and the Ryukyu Islands have N-pattern accent (N型アクセント, enukei akusento), whereby N is a fixed number. This means that while the possibilities of contours for a Tokyo noun phrase is, broadly speaking, equal to its mora count n (maximally four) plus one, these dialects only have a fixed number of possibilities regardless of mora counts, not just for noun phrases, but for verb and adjective phrases as well. The N-pattern systems, including the 1-, 2- and 3-pattern systems, are collectively the second most common systems after the n+1-pattern system.

The common characteristic among N-pattern dialects is that the contour of a minor phrase is primarily determined by its very first component. Regardless of the mora count, even when increased by adding more components, the contour of the entire phrase still matches the pattern of only the first component.

=== 2-pattern accent ===
Certain dialects in Kyushu have 2-pattern accent (二型アクセント, nikei akusento). The only two available pattern patterns in these dialects can be termed Pattern A or Class A (A型, ēgata) and Pattern B or Class B (B型, bīgata). In this section, two dialects are mentioned as representative examples.

==== Kagoshima accent ====
The two patterns of the Kagoshima dialect are as follows (note that /Q/ has the same realizations as in Tokyo Japanese before obstruents, but elsewhere it is [ʔ], or alternatively [t̚] utterance-finally):

	Monosyllabic		Disyllabic	Trisyllabic	Tetrasyllabic	Pentasyllabic	Hexasyllabic
	Unimoraic	Bimoraic	Disyllabic	Trisyllabic	Tetrasyllabic	Pentasyllabic	Hexasyllabic
Pattern A	μ [ˑ] ( σ )	μΜ ( σ )	σ.σ	σ.σ.σ	σ.σ.σ.σ	σ.σ.σ.σ.σ	σ.σ.σ.σ.σ.σ
Pattern A	ha (葉; 'a leaf') / ha [ˑ]/ chi (血; 'blood') / cɕi [ˑ]/		ha ga (葉が) / ha ɡa / chi ga (血が) / cɕi ɡa / ame (飴; 'candy') / a.me / hana (鼻; 'a nose') / ha.na / kawa (川; 'a river') / ka.wa / natsu (夏; 'summer') / na.tsɯ / akka (赤か; 'is red') / aQ.ka /	onago (女子; 'a female person') / o.na.ɡo / Kagoshma (鹿児島; 'Kagoshima') / ka.ɡoɕ.ma / kanashka (悲しか; 'is sad') / ka.naɕ.ka / mukkashka (難しか; 'is difficult') / mɯQ.kaɕ.ka /	kamaboko (蒲鉾) / ka.ma.bo.ko / Kanazawa (金沢) / ka.na.za.wa /	abarabone (肋骨; 'a rib') / a.ba.ɾa.bo.ne /	hatarakimono (働き者; 'a hard worker') / ha.ta.ɾa.ki.mo.no /
Pattern A			kodon (子供; 'a child') / ko.doN /	soroban (算盤; 'an abacus') / so.ɾo.baN /			
Pattern A		nat (泣っ; 'cries') / naQ /	katat (形; 'a shape') / ka.taQ / nobot (登っ; 'climbs') / no.boQ / nangot (南国; 'a southern country') / naN.ɡoQ / daigat (大学; 'university') / dai.ɡaQ /	hatarat (働っ; 'toils') / ha.ta.ɾaQ /	burasagat (ぶら下がっ; 'dangles') / bɯ.ɾa.sa.ɡaQ /		
Pattern A			matsui (祭; 'a festival') / ma.tsɯi / nankai (難解; 'difficult to understand') / naN.kai /	ōtobai (オートバイ; 'a motorbike') / oR.to.bai /			
Pattern A			hanash (話; 'a story') / ha.naɕ / hīmesh (昼飯; 'lunch') / hiR.meɕ /	sodenash (袖無し; 'sleeveless') / so.de.naɕ /			
Pattern B	μ ( σ )	μΜ ( σ )	σ.σ	σ.σ.σ	σ.σ.σ.σ	σ.σ.σ.σ.σ	σ.σ.σ.σ.σ.σ
Pattern B	ha (歯; 'a tooth') / ha / te (手; 'a hand') / te /		ha ga (歯が) / ha ɡa / te ga (手が) / te ɡa / ame (雨; 'rain') / a.me / hana (花; 'a flower') / ha.na / yama (山; 'a mountain') / ja.ma / haru (春; 'springtime') / ha.ɾɯ / Kyōto (京都) / kjoR.to / kōro (航路; 'a sea route') / koR.ɾo /	otoko (男; 'a male person') / o.to.ko / shiroka (白か; 'is white') / ɕi.ɾo.ka / kuwashka (詳しか; 'is detailed') / kɯ.waɕ.ka /	asagao (朝顔; 'picotee morning glory') / a.sa.ɡa.o / atarashka (新しか; 'is new') / a.ta.ɾaɕ.ka /	nodobotoke (喉仏; 'an Adam's apple') / no.do.bo.to.ke /	murasakiiro (紫色; 'the color purple') / mɯ.ɾa.sa.ki.i.ɾo /
Pattern B			kagan (鏡; 'a mirror') / ka.ɡaN / kanban (看板; 'a signboard') / kaN.baN /				
Pattern B		mot (持っ; 'holds') / moQ /	usat (兎; 'a leporid') / ɯ.saQ / oyot (泳っ; 'swims') / o.joQ / gaikot (外国; 'a foreign country') / ɡai.koQ /	atsumat (集まっ; 'gathers') / a.tsɯ.maQ /	kanashigat (悲しがっ; 'appears sad') / ka.na.ɕi.ɡaQ /		
Pattern B			Tōkyō (東京) / toR.kjoR /				
Pattern B			hikai (光; 'light') / hi.kai / nankai (何回; 'how many times') / naN.kai /	aribai (アリバイ; 'an alibi') / a.ɾi.bai /			
Pattern B			oyash (萌やし; 'malt') / o.jaɕ /	asamesh (朝飯; 'breakfast') / a.sa.meɕ / uguis (鶯; 'a Japanese bush warbler') / ɯ.ɡɯ.is /			

Unlike in Tokyo accent, the tone-bearing unit in Kagoshima accent is the syllable, not the mora. In Pattern A, only the penultimate syllable bears a high tone, while all others bear low tones; thus, there is always an accentual fall from the penultimate to final mora. However, if the phrase is monosyllabic and bimoraic, only the first mora bears the high tone, while the second, here generalized by the capital Greek letter Μ, bears a low tone; and if the phrase is both monosyllabic and unimoraic, its vowel is slightly lengthened to accommodate the accentual fall. In Pattern B, there is no accentual fall, and only the final syllable bears the high tone.

Nuclei in Tokyo words are generally fixed before particles and auxiliaries (see Japanese pitch accent rules and Japanese pitch accent rules (verbs and adjectives)). In Kagoshima accent, however, the high tone is mobile before most particles and auxiliaries and shifts rightward as more particles and auxiliaries are added to the same minor phrase to preserve the accent pattern of the word at the beginning:

	Noun (Note: Den and bakkai are respectively the Kagoshima equivalents of the Tokyo de mo and bakari.)	Verb	Adjective
Pattern A	ame (飴; 'candy'): / a.me /: / a.me ɡa , a.me mo , a.me deN /; / a.me ma.de → a.me ma.de mo , a.me ma.de deN /; / a.me baQ.kai → a.me baQ.kai ɡa /	nat (泣っ; 'cries'): / naQ /: Perfect: / ne.ta /; Provisional: / na.ke.ba /; Imperfect negative: / na.kaN /; Imperfect causative: / na.ka.sɯQ /; Imperfect passive-potential: / na.ka.ɾɯQ /	akka (赤か; 'is red'): / aQ.ka /: Gerund: / aQ.ka de /; Perfect: / aQ.kaQ.ta /; Provisional: / aQ.ka.ɾe.ba /
Pattern B	ame (雨; 'rain'): / a.me /: / a.me ɡa , a.me mo , a.me deN /; / a.me ma.de → a.me ma.de mo , a.me ma.de deN /; / a.me baQ.kai → a.me baQ.kai ɡa /	mot (持っ; 'holds'): / moQ /: Perfect: / moQ.ta /; Provisional: / mo.te.ba /; Imperfect negative: / mo.taN /; Imperfect causative: / mo.ta.sɯQ /; Imperfect passive-potential: / mo.ta.ɾɯQ /	shiroka (白か; 'is white'): / ɕi.ɾo.ka /: Gerund: / ɕi.ɾo.ka de /; Perfect: / ɕi.ɾo.kaQ.ta /; Provisional: / ɕi.ɾo.ka.ɾe.ba /

Some particles and auxiliaries can break away into their own minor phrase, although they may not bear any high tone if they are monosyllabic and utterance-final:

	Noun + particle/Pattern-B auxiliary (Note: Ka, ya and na are all Kagoshima interrogative equivalents of Tokyo ka, and ja is the copular equivalent of da.)	Verb + Pattern-A auxiliary (Note: ‑chot/‑jot are the reduced forms of ‑te oru/‑de oru, which are the western equivalents of ‑te iru/‑de iru.)
Pattern A	ame (飴; 'candy'): / a.me /: / a.me | ka , a.me | ja , a.me | na /; Imperfect: / a.me | ʑa /; Perfect: / a.me | ʑaQ.ta /	nobot (登っ; 'climbs'): / no.boQ /: Imperfect: / no.boQ | cɕoQ /; Imperfect negative: / no.boQ | cɕo.ɾaN /; Negative gerund: / no.boQ | cɕo.ɾaN de /
Pattern B	ame (雨; 'rain'): / a.me /: / a.me | ka , a.me | ja , a.me | na /; Imperfect: / a.me | ʑa /; Perfect: / a.me | ʑaQ.ta /	oyot (泳っ; 'swims'): / o.joQ /: Imperfect: / o.joi | ʑoQ /; Imperfect negative: / o.joi | ʑo.ɾaN /; Negative gerund: / o.joi | ʑo.ɾaN de /

A major phrase can be constructed from several minor phrases as follows:

- kodon ga akka hana o mot chot (子供が赤か花を持っちょっ; 'the child is holding a red flower'):
  / ko.doN → ko.doN ɡa / + / aQ.ka / + / ha.na → ha.na o / + / moQ | cɕoQ / → / ko.doN ɡa | aQ.ka | ha.na o | moQ | cɕoQ /

Kagoshima compound nouns, including proper names, have the same pattern as their first components. In contrast, long Tokyo compound nouns are determined by their second components (see Japanese pitch accent rules § Long compounds):

	Kagoshima compound	Tokyo equivalent
Pattern A	hana (鼻; 'a nose'): / ha.na /	hana: / ha.na /
Pattern A	hanawa (鼻輪; 'a nose ring'): / ha.na.wa /	hanawa: / ha.na.wa /
Pattern A	hanao (鼻緒; 'a strap on a geta'): / ha.na.o /	hanao: / ha.na.o /
Pattern A	hanait (鼻息; 'nasal breath'): / ha.na.iQ /	hanaiki: / ha.na.i.ki /
Pattern A	hanamit (鼻水; 'nasal mucus'): / ha.na.miQ /	hanamizu: / ha.na.mi.zɯ /
Pattern A	hanagoe (鼻声; 'a nasal voice'): / ha.na.ɡo.e /	hanagoe: / ha.na.ɡo.e /
Pattern A	hanazumai (鼻詰まい; 'nasal congestion'): / ha.na.zɯ.mai /	hanazumari (鼻詰まり): / ha.na.zɯ.ma.ɾi /
Pattern A	kawa (川; 'a river'): / ka.wa /	kawa: / ka.wa /
Pattern A	Kawamura (川村): / ka.wa.mɯ.ɾa /	Kawamura: / ka.wa.mɯ.ɾa /
Pattern A	Kawakami (川上): / ka.wa.ka.mi /	Kawakami: / ka.wa.ka.mi /
Pattern A	Kawabata (川畑): / ka.wa.ba.ta /	Kawabata: / ka.wa.ba.ta /
Pattern A	natsu (夏; 'summer'): / na.tsɯ /	natsu: / na.tsɯ / → Natsu: / na.tsɯ /
Pattern A	Natsuko (夏子): / na.tsɯ.ko /	Natsuko: / na.tsɯ.ko /
Pattern A	Natsumi (夏美): / na.tsɯ.mi /	Natsumi: / na.tsɯ.mi /
Pattern A	Natsuyo (夏代): / na.tsɯ.jo /	Natsuyo: / na.tsɯ.jo /
Pattern A	Natsue (夏江): / na.tsɯ.e /	Natsue: / na.tsɯ.e /
Pattern A	Natsuo (夏雄): / na.tsɯ.o /	Natsuo: / na.tsɯ.o /
Pattern A	Kanazawa (金沢): / ka.na.za.wa /	Kanazawa: / ka.na.za.wa /
Pattern A	Kanazawa Daigat (金沢大学; 'Kanazawa University'): / ka.na.za.wa dai.ɡaQ /	Kanazawa Daigaku: / ka.na.za.wa dai.ɡa.kɯ /
Pattern A	Kanazawa kōro (金沢航路; 'the Kanazawa sea route'): / ka.na.za.wa koR.ɾo /	Kanazawa kōro: / ka.na.za.wa koR.ɾo /
Pattern A	Kagoshma (鹿児島): / ka.ɡoɕ.ma /	Kagoshima: / ka.ɡo.ɕi.ma /
Pattern A	Kagoshma Daigat (鹿児島大学; 'Kagoshima University'): / ka.ɡoɕ.ma dai.ɡaQ /	Kagoshima Daigaku: / ka.ɡo.ɕi.ma dai.ɡa.kɯ /
Pattern A	Kagoshma kōro (鹿児島航路; 'the Kagoshima sea route'): / ka.ɡoɕ.ma koR.ɾo /	Kagoshima kōro: / ka.ɡo.ɕi.ma koR.ɾo /
Pattern B	hana (花; 'a flower'): / ha.na /	hana: / ha.na /
Pattern B	hanawa (花輪; 'a floral wreath'): / ha.na.wa /	hanawa: / ha.na.wa /
Pattern B	hanakago (花籠; 'a flower basket'): / ha.na.ka.ɡo /	hanakago: / ha.na.ka.ɡo /
Pattern B	hanagasa (花笠; 'a flower-adorned kasa'): / ha.na.ɡa.sa /	hanagasa: / ha.na.ɡa.sa /
Pattern B	hanabatake (花畑; 'a flower field'): / ha.na.ba.ta.ke /	hanabatake: / ha.na.ba.ta.ke /
Pattern B	yama (山; 'a mountain'): / ja.ma /	yama: / ja.ma /
Pattern B	Yamamura (山村): / ja.ma.mɯ.ɾa /	Yamamura: / ja.ma.mɯ.ɾa /
Pattern B	Yamagami (山上): / ja.ma.ɡa.mi /	Yamagami: / ja.ma.ɡa.mi /
Pattern B	Yamashita (山下): / ja.maɕ.ta /	Yamashita: / ja.ma.ɕi.ta /
Pattern B	haru (春; 'springtime'): / ha.ɾɯ /	haru: / ha.ɾɯ /
Pattern B	Haruko (春子): / ha.ɾɯ.ko /	Haruko: / ha.ɾɯ.ko /
Pattern B	Harumi (春美): / ha.ɾɯ.mi /	Harumi: / ha.ɾɯ.mi /
Pattern B	Haruyo (春代): / ha.ɾɯ.jo /	Haruyo: / ha.ɾɯ.jo /
Pattern B	Harue (春江): / ha.ɾɯ.e /	Harue: / ha.ɾɯ.e /
Pattern B	Haruo (春雄): / ha.ɾɯ.o /	Haruo: / ha.ɾɯ.o /
Pattern B	Kyōto (京都): / kjoR.to /	Kyōto: / kjoR.to /
Pattern B	Kyōto Daigat (京都大学; 'Kyoto University'): / kjoR.to dai.ɡaQ /	Kyōto Daigaku: / kjoR.to dai.ɡa.kɯ ~ kjoR.to dai.ɡa.kɯ /
Pattern B	Kyōto kōro (京都航路; 'the Kyoto sea route'): / kjoR.to koR.ɾo /	Kyōto kōro: / kjoR.to koR.ɾo ~ kjoR.to koR.ɾo /
Pattern B	Tōkyō (東京): / toR.kjoR /	Tōkyō: / toR.kjoR ~ toR.kjoR /
Pattern B	Tōkyō Daigat (東京大学; 'Tokyo University'): / toR.kjoR dai.ɡaQ /	Tōkyō Daigaku: / toR.kjoR dai.ɡa.kɯ ~ toR.kjoR dai.ɡa.kɯ /
Pattern B	Tōkyō kōro (東京航路; 'the Tokyo sea route'): / toR.kjoR koR.ɾo /	Tōkyō kōro: / toR.kjoR koR.ɾo ~ toR.kjoR koR.ɾo /

==== Nagasaki accent ====
Disregarding other regional variants within Nagasaki, the mainstream accent patterns of the Nagasaki dialect can be summarized as follows:

	Bimoraic	Trimoraic	Quadrimoraic	Quinquemoraic	Sexamoraic
Pattern A	μμ	μμμ	μμμμ	μμμμμ	μμμμμμ
Pattern A	hā (葉; 'a leaf') / haR / kō (斯う; 'thus') / koR / kī (キー; 'a key') / kiR /	kikō (聞こう; 'let's listen') / kikoR / sukī (スキー; 'skiing') / sɯkiR / sofā (ソファー; 'a sofa') / soɸaR / barē (バレー; 'volleyball') / baɾeR /	sukāto (スカート; 'a skirt') / sɯkaRto / sukēto (スケート; 'skating') / sɯkeRto / sutōbu (ストーブ; 'a heater') / sɯtoRbɯ / sutōbu (ストーブ; 'a heater') / sɯtoRbɯ / supīdo (スピード; 'speed') / sɯpiRdo /		
Pattern A		rōka (廊下; 'a corridor') / ɾoRka / kādo (カード; 'a card') / kaRdo / kēki (ケーキ; 'cake') / keRki / jūsu (ジュース; 'juice') / ʑɯRsɯ / bīru (ビール; 'beer') / biRɾɯ /	ōbā (オーバー; 'an overcoat') / oRbaR / kāten (カーテン; 'a curtain') / kaRteN / kūrā (クーラー; 'an air conditioner') / kɯRɾaR / sētā (セーター; 'a sweater') / seRtaR / pīman (ピーマン; 'a bell pepper') / piRmaN /	sōsēji (ソーセージ; 'sausage') / soRseRʑi / chūrippu (チューリップ; 'a tulip') / cɕɯRɾiQpɯ / pīnattsu (ピーナッツ; 'a peanut') / piRnaQtsɯ / māketto (マーケット; 'a market') / maRkeQto /	
Pattern A	ha no (葉の) / ha no / hana (鼻; 'a nose') / hana / mizu (水; 'water') / mizɯ / michi (道; 'a road') / micɕi / kami (紙; 'paper') / kami / kaze (風; 'wind') / kaze / hima (暇; 'spare time') / hima / iku (行く; 'goes') / ikɯ /	inaka (田舎; 'the countryside') / inaka / watari (渡り; 'passage') / wataɾi / hidoka (酷か; 'is cruel') / hidoka /	gasorin (ガソリン; 'gasoline') / ɡasoɾiN /	purezento (プレゼント; 'a present') / pɯɾezeNto /	
Pattern A	ten (天; 'the sky') / teN /	meron (メロン; 'melon') / meɾoN /	jitensha (自転車; 'a bicycle') / ʑiteNɕa / sutando (スタンド; 'the stands') / sɯtaNdo / suponji (スポンジ; 'sponge') / sɯpoNʑi /	karendā (カレンダー; 'a calendar; a calender') / kaɾeNdaR /	
Pattern A		Indo (インド; 'India') / iNdo / tanku (タンク; 'a tank') / taNkɯ / tento (テント; 'a tent') / teNto /	enjin (エンジン; 'an engine') / eNʑiN / sandaru (サンダル; 'a sandal') / saNdaɾɯ / tonneru (トンネル; 'a tunnel') / toNneɾɯ / pinpon (ピンポン; 'Ping-Pong') / piNpoN /	wanpīsu (ワンピース; 'one-piece') / waNpiRsɯ /	
Pattern A	sut (すっ; 'does') / sɯQ /	kisut (着すっ; 'puts clothes on someone else') / kisɯQ /	sutekki (ステッキ; 'a walking stick') / sɯteQki / torakku (トラック; 'a truck; a track') / toɾaQkɯ / robotto (ロボット; 'a robot') / ɾoboQto /		
Pattern A		kyappu (キャップ; 'a cap') / kjaQpɯ / koppu (コップ; 'a cup') / koQpɯ / zukku (ズック; 'cotton duck') / zɯQkɯ / netto (ネット; 'a net') / neQto / beddo (ベッド; 'a bed') / beQdo /	kattā (カッター; 'a box cutter') / kaQtaR /		ryukkusakku (リュックサック; 'a rucksack') / ɾjɯQkɯsaQkɯ /
Pattern A	hai (灰; 'ash') / hai /	shihai (支配; 'domination') / ɕihai /			
Pattern A		Doitsu (ドイツ; 'Germany') / doitsɯ / naifu (ナイフ; 'a knife') / naiɸɯ /	sairen (サイレン; 'a siren') / saiɾeN /		saikuringu (サイクリング; 'cycling') / saikɯɾiNɡɯ /
Pattern A	kau (買う; 'buys') / kaɯ /	tsukau (使う; 'uses') / tsɯkaɯ /			
Pattern A		auto (アウト; 'out') / aɯto /			
Pattern B	μμ	μμμ	μμμμ	μμμμμ	μμμμμμ
Pattern B	hā (歯; 'a tooth') / haR / zō (象; 'an elephant') / zoR / kyō (今日; 'today') / kjoR /		kōhī (コーヒー; 'coffee') / koRhiR /	danpu kā (ダンプカー; 'a dump truck') / daNpɯ kaR /	erebētā (エレベーター; 'an elevator') / eɾebeRtaR /
Pattern B	ha no (歯の) / ha no / kusa (草; 'grass') / kɯsa / iro (色; 'a color') / iɾo / oya (親; 'a parent') / oja / yubi (指; 'a finger') / jɯbi / mono (者; 'a person') / mono / umi (海; 'a sea') / ɯmi / yume (夢; 'a dream') / jɯme / yomu (読む; 'reads') / jomɯ /	tabako (タバコ; 'tobacco') / tabako / samuka (寒か; 'is cold') / samɯka /	kasutera (カステラ; 'castela') / kasɯteɾa / Furansu (フランス; 'France') / ɸɯɾaNsɯ /	arukōru (アルコール; 'alcohol') / aɾɯkoRɾɯ / anmonia (アンモニア; 'ammonia') / aNmonia / bōringu (ボーリング; 'bowling') / boRɾiNɡɯ /	karē raisu (カレーライス; 'curry rice') / kaɾeR ɾaisɯ / kyasshu kādo (キャッシュカード; 'a cash card') / kjaQɕɯ kaRdo / dainamaito (ダイナマイト; 'dynamite') / dainamaito /
Pattern B	ten (点; 'a point') / teN / den (出ん; 'doesn't exit') / deN /	zabon (ザボン; 'a pomelo') / zaboN / totan (トタン; 'galvanized iron') / totaN /		baiorin (バイオリン; 'a violin') / baioɾiN / furaipan (フライパン; 'a frypan') / ɸɯɾaipaN /	
Pattern B	sut (刷っ; 'prints') / sɯQ / zut (出っ; 'exits') / zɯQ /				
Pattern B	kai (貝; 'a shellfish') / kai / tai (鯛; 'a seabream') / tai /				
Pattern B	au (会う; 'meets') / aɯ / hau (這う; 'crawls') / haɯ /				

In Pattern A there is an accentual fall from the first two morae to the third mora; bimoraic phrases can only accommodate a fall from the first to second mora, and phrases that are otherwise unimoraic in other dialects are lengthened to make room for this fall. In Pattern B there is an accentual rise from the penultimate to last mora, which is comparatively weaker than the similar rise in Kagoshima accent; and some phrases may also be lengthened to accommodate it.

The tone-bearing unit in Nagasaki accent is generally the mora. In certain cases where Pattern B involves /N, Q, R, i, ɯ/ at the end of the minor phrase, it appears that it is the syllable that bears the high tone, or there is no high tone at all:

- /N/: futon (布団) /ɸɯtoN ~ ɸɯtoN /, atama n (頭ん; 'the head's') /atama N ~ atama N /, etc.
- /Q/: misut (見すっ; 'shows') /misɯQ ~ misɯQ /, derarut (出らるっ; 'can exit') /deɾaɾɯQ ~ deɾaɾɯQ /, etc.
- /R/: yomō (読もう; 'let's read') /jomoR ~ jomoR /, tanomō (頼もう; 'let's request') /tanomoR ~ tanomoR /, etc.
- /i/: shikai (司会; 'presiding') /ɕikai ~ ɕikai /, etc.
- /ɯ/: machigau (間違う; 'is mistaken') /macɕiɡaɯ ~ macɕiɡaɯ /, etc.

Short Nagasaki compounds (see Japanese pitch accent rules § Modifier–head compound nouns) tend to preserve the accent pattern of the first component just like in Kagoshima accent, but long compounds may be Pattern B regardless:

	Pattern-A compound	Pattern-B compound
Pattern-A 1st component	hana (鼻; 'a nose'): / hana /; hanamizu (鼻水; 'nasal mucus'): / hanamizɯ /; michi (道; 'a road'): / micɕi /; michikusa (道草; 'roadside grass'): / micɕikɯsa /	
Pattern-A 1st component		inaka (田舎; 'the countryside'): / inaka /; inakamono (田舎者; 'a bumpkin'): / inakamono /; watari (渡り; 'passage'): / wataɾi /; watarirōka (渡り廊下; 'a breezeway'): / wataɾiɾoRka /
Pattern-B 1st component		iro (色; 'a color'): / iɾo /; irogami (色紙; 'colored paper'): / iɾoɡami /; oya (親; 'a parent'): / oja /; oyayubi (親指; 'a thumb'): / ojajɯbi /

Some particles and auxiliaries preserve the accent pattern of the word at the beginning of the same minor phrase. The Pattern-A high tone may have more room to be fully realized as the mora count reaches three, while the Pattern-B one shifts rightward:

	Noun	Verb (Note: Rashika is the Nagasaki semblative equivalent of the Tokyo rashī, ‑taka is the desirative equivalent of ‑tai, and ‑tai/‑dai are the representative equivalents of ‑tari/‑dari.)
Pattern A	kaze (風; 'wind'): / kaze /: / kaze no , kaze wa /; / kaze kaɾa , kaze deN /	iku (行く; 'goes'): / ikɯ /: Negative imperative: / ikɯ na /; Imperfect semblative: / ikɯ ɾaɕika /; Imperfect desirative: / ikitaka /; Perfect: / iQta /; Representative: / iQtai /; Imperfect negative: / ikaN /; Imperfect causative: / ikasɯɾɯ /
Pattern B	umi (海; 'a sea'): / ɯmi /: / ɯmi no , ɯmi wa /; / ɯmi kaɾa , ɯmi deN /	yomu (読む; 'reads'): / jomɯ /: Negative imperative: / jomɯ na /; Imperfect semblative: / jomɯ ɾaɕika /; Imperfect desirative: / jomitaka /; Perfect: / joNda /; Representative: / joNdai /; Imperfect negative: / jomaN /; Imperfect causative: / jomasɯɾɯ /

Other particles and auxiliaries form their own minor phrase, and some may have irregular contours:

	Noun (Note: Jatta/yatta are the Nagasaki perfect copular equivalents of the Tokyo datta.)	Verb (Note: Jaro/yaro are the Nagasaki tentative copular equivalents of the Tokyo daro(o), and bakkai is the equivalent of bakari.)	Adjective
Pattern A	hima (暇; 'spare time'): / hima /: / hima | ʑaQta /	iku (行く; 'goes'): / ikɯ /: / ikɯ | zo /; / ikɯ | ʑaɾo /; / ikɯ | dake /; / ikɯ | baQkai /	hidoka (酷か; 'is cruel'): / hidoka /: / hidoka | ɕi /
Pattern B	yume (夢; 'a dream'): / jɯme /: / jɯme | ʑaQta /	yomu (読む; 'reads'): / jomɯ /: / jomɯ | zo /; / jomɯ | ʑaɾo /; / jomɯ | dake /; / jomɯ | baQkai /	samuka (寒か; 'is cold'): / samɯka /: / samɯka | ɕi /

Yoru (progressive) and toru (perfect with a persistent result), the Nagasaki equivalents of ‑te oru/‑te iru, are in the same minor phrase as the beginning verb in the affirmative, or in their own minor phrase in the negative:

Pattern A	iku (行く; 'goes'): / ikɯ /: Imperfect: / iki joɾɯ /; Perfect: / iki joQta /; Imperfect negative: / iki | joɾaN ~ iki | joɾaN /
Pattern B	yomu (読む; 'reads'): / jomɯ /: Imperfect: / jomi joɾɯ /; Perfect: / jomi joQta /; Imperfect negative: / jomi | joɾaN ~ jomi | joɾaN /

=== 3-pattern accent ===
Most dialects of the Oki Islands have 3-pattern accent (三型アクセント, sankei akusento), with the exception of the 2-pattern Chibu dialect.

==== Goka accent ====
The accent system of Goka, a former village on the Oki Islands, can be summarized as follows:

	Unimoraic	Bimoraic	Trimoraic	Quadrimoraic	Quinquemoraic	Sexamoraic
Pattern A		μμ	μμμ	μμμμ	μμμμμ	μμμμμμ
Pattern A		tori (鳥; 'a bird') / toɾi /	tori ga (鳥が) / toɾi ɡa / kuruma (車; 'a car') / kɯɾɯma /	tori kara (鳥から) / toɾi kaɾa / kuruma ga (車が) / kɯɾɯma ɡa / kanemochi (金持ち; 'a rich person') / kanemocɕi /	tori kara mo (鳥からも) / toɾi kaɾa mo / kuruma kara (車) / kɯɾɯma kaɾa / kanemochi ga (金持ちが) / kanemocɕi ɡa /	tori kara shika (鳥からしか) / toɾi kaɾa ɕika / kuruma kara mo (車からも) / kɯɾɯma kaɾa mo / kanemochi kara (金持ちから) / kanemocɕi kaɾa /
Pattern B	μ	μμ	μμμ	μμμμ	μμμμμ	μμμμμμ
Pattern B	e (柄; 'a handle') / e /	e ga (柄が) / e ɡa / yama (山; 'a mountain') / jama /	e kara (柄から) / e kaɾa / yama ga (山が) / jama ɡa / momiji (紅葉; 'maple') / momiʑi /	e kara mo (柄からも) / e kaɾa mo / yama kara (山から) / jama kaɾa / momiji ga (紅葉が) / momiʑi ɡa / asagao (朝顔; 'picotee morning glory') / asaɡao /	e kara shika (柄からしか) / e kaɾa ɕika / yama kara mo (山からも) / jama kaɾa mo / momiji kara (紅葉から) / momiʑi kaɾa / asagao ga (朝顔が) / asaɡao ɡa /	e kara made mo (柄からまでも) / e kaɾa made mo / yama kara shika (山からしか) / jama kaɾa ɕika / momiji kara mo (紅葉からも) / momiʑi kaɾa mo / asagao kara (朝顔から) / asaɡao kaɾa /
Pattern C	μ	μμ	μμμ	μμμμ	μμμμμ	μμμμμμ
Pattern C	e (絵; 'an illustration') / e /	e ga (絵が) / e ɡa / ame (雨; 'rain') / ame /	e kara (絵から) / e kaɾa / ame ga (雨が) / ame ɡa / nezumi (鼠; 'a murid') / nezɯmi /	e kara mo (絵からも) / e kaɾa mo / ame kara (雨から) / ame kaɾa / nezumi ga (鼠が) / nezɯmi ɡa / niwatori (鶏; 'a chicken') / niwatoɾi /	e kara shika (絵からしか) / e kaɾa ɕika / ame kara mo (雨からも) / ame kaɾa mo / nezumi kara (鼠から) / nezɯmi kaɾa / niwatori ga (鶏が) / niwatoɾi ɡa /	e kara made mo (絵からまでも) / e kaɾa made mo / ame kara shika (雨からしか) / ame kaɾa ɕika / nezumi kara mo (鼠からも) / nezɯmi kaɾa mo / niwatori kara (鶏から) / niwatoɾi kaɾa /

The Pattern-A contour involves two high tones, the first of which is on the first mora, while the second is on the second mora in a bimoraic phrase, the third mora in a tri- or quadrimoraic phrase, and the fourth mora in a quinquemoraic or longer phrase. In a trimoraic or longer phrase, the Pattern-B contour has its high tone on the second mora, and the Pattern-C contour has its on the first mora; in a bimoraic phrase, both patterns have its high tone on the first mora, although Pattern C has a mid tone on the second mora (here marked with a lower, dashed line) while Pattern B has a low tone; and in a unimoraic phrase, both Pattern B and C simply have a high tone on the entire mora.

As shown above, most particles belong to the same minor phrase as the nouns before them. There are two exceptional particles:

Pattern A	kuruma (車; 'a car'): / kɯɾɯma /: / kɯɾɯma ni | dake , kɯɾɯma ni | bakaɾi /
Pattern B	momiji (紅葉; 'maple'): / momiʑi /: / momiʑi ni | dake , momiʑi ni | bakaɾi /
Pattern C	nezumi (鼠; 'a murid'): / nezɯmi /: / nezɯmi ni | dake , nezɯmi ni | bakaɾi /

Compounds whose first components are Patterns A and B tend to be Pattern A. Those whose first components are Pattern C remain Pattern C:

	Pattern-A compound	Pattern-C compound
Pattern-A 1st component	migi (右; 'right'): / miɡi /; migiude (右腕; 'the right arm'): / miɡiɯde /; migigawa (右側; 'the right side'): / miɡiɡawa /; migikiki (右利き; 'right-handedness'): / miɡikiki /; migimawari (右回り; 'turning right'): / miɡimawaɾi /; niwa (庭; 'a garden'): / niwa /; niwaishi (庭石; 'a garden stone'): / niwaiɕi /; niwashigoto (庭仕事; 'gardening'): / niwaɕiɡoto /; niwaijiri (庭弄り; 'gardening'): / niwaiʑiɾi /	
Pattern-B 1st component	natsu (夏; 'summer'): / natsɯ /; natsufuku (夏服; 'summer clothes'): / natsɯɸɯkɯ /; natsuyase (夏痩せ; 'summer weight loss'): / natsɯjase /; natsuyasumi (夏休み; 'summer break'): / natsɯjasɯmi /; ashi (足; 'a foot ~ a leg'): / aɕi /; ashikoshi (足腰; 'legs and loins'): / aɕikoɕi /; ashiato (足跡; 'a footprint'): / aɕiato /; ashioto (足音; 'a footstep sound'): / aɕioto /; ashikubi (足首; 'an ankle'): / aɕikɯbi /	
Pattern-C 1st component		nabe (鍋; 'a cookpot'): / nabe /: nabemono (鍋物; 'a hotpot'): / nabemono /; nabeshiki (鍋敷き; 'a pot stand'): / nabeɕiki /

=== 1-pattern accent ===
Examples of 1-pattern accent (一型アクセント, ikkei akusento) include the Miyakonojō, Kobayashi (Miyazaki Prefecture) and Shibushi (Kagoshima Prefecture) dialects among others.

==== Miyakonojō accent ====
All phrases in the Miyakonojō dialect contain an accentual rise from the penultimate to last syllable. There is no such rise only in monosyllabic phrases.

Monosyllabic	Disyllabic	Trisyllabic	Tetrasyllabic	Pentasyllabic	Hexasyllabic
μ	μμ	μμμ	μμμμ	μμμμμ	μμμμμμ
e (柄; 'a handle') /e/	e ga (柄が) / e ɡa / yama (山; 'a mountain') / ja.ma / hana (鼻; 'a nose') / ha.na /	yama ga (山が) / ja.ma ɡa / kokoro (心; 'a heart') / ko.ko.ɾo / onago (女子; 'a female person') / o.na.ɡo / otoko (男; 'a male person') / o.to.ko / ageta (上げた; 'raised') / a.ɡe.ta / sageta (下げた; 'lowered') / sa.ɡe.ta /	yama kara (山から) / ja.ma ka.ɾa / kokoro ga (心が) / ko.ko.ɾo ɡa / asagao (朝顔; 'picotee morning glory') / a.sa.ɡa.o / agureba (上ぐれば; 'provided one raises') / a.ɡɯ.ɾe.ba / sagureba (下ぐれば; 'provided one lowers') / sa.ɡɯ.ɾe.ba /	yama kara mo (山からも) / ja.ma ka.ɾa mo / asagao ga (朝顔が) / a.sa.ɡa.o ɡa /	
mit (水; 'water') /miQ/	agut (上ぐっ; 'raises') / a.ɡɯQ / sagut (下ぐっ; 'lowers') / sa.ɡɯQ /	tomodat (友達; 'a friend') / to.mo.daQ / hanamit (鼻水; 'nasal mucus') / ha.na.miQ /			onago tomodat (女子友達; 'a female friend') / o.na.ɡo to.mo.daQ / otoko tomodat (男友達; 'a male friend') / o.to.ko to.mo.daQ /
	agen (上げん; 'doesn't raise') / a.ɡeN / sagen (下げん; 'doesn't lower') / sa.ɡeN /	irogan (色紙; 'colored paper') / i.ɾo.ɡaN /			

== No accent ==
Most dialects in Miyagi, Fukushima, Ibaraki, Tochigi, Kumamoto and Miyazaki Prefectures have no contrastive accent and are considered to be "accentless" (無アクセント方言, muakusento hōgen; lit. 'accentless dialects' or 無型アクセント方言, mukei akusento hōgen; lit. 'patternless-accent dialects'). While the lack of accentual contrast is also a feature of Miyakonojō accent, the difference between "1-pattern accent" and "no accent" is that the former has a consistent pitch pattern across all phrases, while the latter does not involve any fixed pitch pattern. As such, not only is there no contrast between ame (飴; 'candy') and ame (雨; 'rain'), both of them can be pronounced arbitrarily with either a high-low or low-high contour, and the actual tones are purely intonational.

== Dialectal correspondence ==
By examining a set of words (Note: Compare lexical sets in English phonology.) with consistent patterns across dialects, as well as historical records of the prestigious Kyoto accent, general correspondence between dialects can be drawn. In some cases, such correspondence allows predicting the accent patterns of certain words in two directions, ie one dialect permits predicting another and vice versa, as there is one-to-one correspondence between those dialects; in other cases, there is two-to-one correspondence, which means it is possible to predict in one direction but not in the opposite.

In the following table, five sets (類, rui) of bimoraic nouns were used to deduce dialectal correspondence. Four representative members of each set are listed, two of which end in an open vowel (/e, a, o/) and two end in a close vowel (/i, ɯ ~ u/), which are accentually distinguished in certain dialects such as Toyama. The circles represent the prosodic units in the dialects, whether they be morae or syllables; the downward triangles stand for particles (such as ga or wa).

Dialect	Set 1 (第一類, dai ichirui)		Set 2 (第二類, dai nirui)		Set 3 (第三類, dai sanrui)		Set 4 (第四類, dai yonrui)		Set 5 (第五類, dai gorui)	
Dialect	niwa (庭; 'a garden') take (竹; 'bamboo')	mizu (水; 'water') tori (鳥; 'a bird')	uta (歌; 'a song') oto (音; 'sound')	natsu (夏; 'summer') ishi (石; 'a stone')	inu (犬; 'a dog') kami (髪; 'hair')	hana (花; 'a flower') iro (色; 'a color')	kasa (笠) fune (船; 'a watercraft')	matsu (松; 'pine') hashi (箸; 'a chopstick')	haru (春; 'springtime') aki (秋; 'autumn')	ame (雨; 'rain') mado (窓; 'a window')
Kōchi	○○ ○○▽		○○ ○○▽				○○ ○○▽		○○ ○○▽	
Tokushima	○○ ○○▽		○○ ○○▽				○○ ○○▽		○○〜○○ ○○▽	
Osaka	○○ ○○▽		○○ ○○▽				○○ ○○▽		○○ ○○▽〜○○▽	
Kyoto	○○ ○○▽		○○ ○○▽				○○ ○○▽		○○ ○○▽〜○○▽	
Akita	○○ ○○▽				○○ ○○▽					○○ ○○▽
Hakodate	○○ ○○▽									○○ ○○▽
Toyama	○○ ○○▽		○○ ○○▽	○○ ○○▽			○○ ○○▽			○○ ○○▽
Takada	○○ ○○▽		○○ ○○▽〜○○▽				○○ ○○▽			
Matsumoto	○○ ○○▽		○○ ○○▽				○○ ○○▽			
Tokyo	○○ ○○▽		○○ ○○▽				○○ ○○▽			
Nagoya	○○ ○○▽		○○ ○○▽				○○ ○○▽			
Hiroshima	○○〜○○ ○○▽〜○○▽		○○ ○○▽				○○ ○○▽			
Fukuoka			○○ ○○▽				○○ ○○▽			
Nagasaki	○○ ○○▽				○○ ○○▽					
Kagoshima	○○ ○○▽				○○ ○○▽					

Apart from the five sets of bimoraic nouns, there are three sets of unimoraic nouns, and seven sets of trimoraic nouns although with a lower degree of correspondence. As for verbs, there are two sets of bimorae and up to three sets of trimorae; and there are two sets of trimoraic adjectives.

The above correspondence between bimoraic nouns suggests that the five sets were probably historically distinct, but as the various dialects evolved and diverged, they merged and altered them in different ways. In the following table, merged cells indicate set mergers.

Dialect group	Set configuration				
Primary/Ibuki-style accent (第一次・伊吹(島)式アクセント, dai ichiji / Ibuki(jima)shiki akusento)	1	2	3	4	5
Central-style/Kyoto–Osaka-style accent (中央式・京阪式アクセント, chūōshiki/Keihanshiki akusento)	1	2	3	4	5
Tarui-style accent (垂井式アクセント, Taruishiki akusento)	1			4	5
Tarui-style accent (垂井式アクセント, Taruishiki akusento)	1	2	3	4	5
Sanuki-style accent (讃岐式アクセント, Sanukishiki akusento)	1		3	4	5
Sanuki-style accent (讃岐式アクセント, Sanukishiki akusento)	1	2	3	4	5
Manabe-style accent (真鍋式アクセント, Manabeshiki akusento)	1				5
Manabe-style accent (真鍋式アクセント, Manabeshiki akusento)	1	2	3	4	5
Sōgo-style accent (寒河式アクセント, Sōgoshiki akusento)	1	2		4	5
Sōgo-style accent (寒河式アクセント, Sōgoshiki akusento)	1	2	3	4	5
Tokyo-style accent (東京式アクセント, Tōkyōshiki akusento)	1	2	3	4	5
Tokyo-surrounding-style accent (外輪東京式アクセント, gairin Tōkyōshiki akusento)	1	2	3	4	5

While many dialects in the Tōhoku region, the former Mikawa and Tōtōmi Provinces, Fukuoka, Ōita, Shimane and Tottori Prefectures have been indiscriminately grouped as part of "Tokyo-style accent", this is untenable, as they have different set configurations, and it is implausible for sets to unmerge and then merge with other sets to create a new configuration. As such, it is preferable to refer to these dialects as "Tokyo-surrounding-style accent".

== Accent notation ==
There are several well-established accent notations used in textbooks and pronunciation guides. Many notations assume a simplistic dichotomy between "high" and "low" tones on any given prosodic unit, while others allow both a "high" tone and a "low" tone on a single unit. When it comes to Tokyo accent, it is unnecessary to mark the tone on every single mora, as only the location of the nucleus is contrastive and everything else is predictable. Some sources may use different notations for different purposes.

Notation								Notes	Example sources
○○▽ ハナオ	○○▽ ハナオ	○○▽ ハナオ	○○▽ ハナオ	○○▽ ハナオ	○○▽ ハナオ	○○▽ ハナオ	○○▽○○ ハナオモツ	Circle: prosodic unit; triangle: particle; horizontal solid overline: high; no overline: low; diagonal solid overline: high-falling; horizontal dotted overline: mid or downstepped high.	Nitta (2026)
●●▼	●○▽	○●▼	○●▽	○○▼	○◐▽	○○▽	none	Circle: prosodic unit; triangle: particle; black: high; white: low; half-black, half-white: high-falling.	Sakaguchi (2001), Kindaichi & Akinaga (2025)
							none	Circle: prosodic unit; triangle: particle; black: high; white: low; half-black, half-white: high-falling.	Hirayama (2010)
					none		none	Black circle: prosodic unit; white triangle: particle.	Kindaichi & Akinaga (2025)
					none			Circle: prosodic unit.	Yamada et al. (2020), NHK Broadcasting Culture Research Institute (2025)
HHH	HLL	LHH	LHL	LLH	none	LLL	LHL HL	H: high; L: low. Additional marks from ToBI may be used.	Poser (1984), Vance (1987), Vance (2008), Pierrehumbert & Beckman (1988), Kitahara (1999), Haraguchi (2002), Labrune (2012)
ハナオ	ハナオ	ハナオ	ハナオ	ハナオ	ハナオ	ハナオ	ハナオモツ	Overline: high; underline: low; midline: downstepped high; left top corner: rise; right top corner: fall.	Pierrehumbert & Beckman (1988), Kōri (2024)
ハナオ	ハナオ	ハナオ	ハナオ	ハナオ	ハナオ	ハナオ	ハナオモツ ハナオ・モツ	Solid overline: high; no overline: low; dotted overline: downstepped high; left corner: rise; right corner: fall; middle dot: minor break.	Hirayama (2010)
ハナオ	ハナオ	ハナオ	ハナオ	ハナオ	ハナオ	ハナオ	ハナオ・モツ	Overline: high; overline: low; right corner: fall; middle dot: minor break.	NHK Broadcasting Culture Research Institute (1998), Kindaichi & Akinaga (2025)
⌜hana o	⌜ha⌝na o	ha⌜na o	ha⌜na⌝ o	hana ⌜o	ha⌜na⌝⌝ o	hana o	ha⌜na⌝ o ⌜mo⌝tu	Left corner: rise; single right corner: fall from the preceding unit to the following unit; double right corner: fall within the preceding unit.	Kibe (2025)
[hana o	[ha]na o	ha[na o	ha[na] o	hana [o	ha[na]] o	hana o	ha[na] o [mo]tu	Left bracket: rise; single right bracket: fall from the preceding unit to the following unit; double right bracket: fall within the preceding unit.	Kibe (2012), Uwano (2012)
none	ハ＼ナオ	ハナオ￣	ハナ＼オ	none			ハナ＼オ・モ＼ツ	Backslash: accentual fall; overline: no nucleus; middle dot: minor break. Tokyo only.	NHK Broadcasting Culture Research Institute (2025)
none	/haꜜna o/	/hana o/	/hanaꜜ o/	none			/hanaꜜ o ¦ moꜜtsu/	Superscript downward arrow: accentual fall; broken vertical bar: minor break. Note that ꜜ is the IPA symbol for downstep, properly placed before a downstepped high tone, not after a nucleus. Tokyo only.	Vance (2008)
none	ha'na o	hana o	hana' o	none			hana' o mo'tu	Apostrophe or single right quote: accentual fall. Tokyo only.	Poser (1984), Pierrehumbert & Beckman (1988), Maekawa (1990), Kubozono (2002), Kubozono (2023)
none	hána o	hana o	haná o	none			haná o | mótu	Acute: nuclear high; vertical bar: minor break. Tokyo only.	Vance (1987), Hasegawa (1999), Martin (2004)
none	**ha**na o /**ha**na o/	hana o° /hana o/	ha**na** o /ha**na** o/	none			ha**na** o **mo**tsu /ha**na** o **mo**tu/	Bold: nucleus; degree sign: no nucleus. Tokyo only.	Labrune (2012)
none	[ˈhana o]	[hana o]	[haˈna o]	none			[haˈna o ˈmot͡sɨ]	Primary stress mark: nucleus. Tokyo only.	Labrune (2012)
none	１	０	２	none			２-１	0: no nucleus; positive integer: nucleus location, counted from left to right; hyphen: minor break. Tokyo only.	Matsumura & 三省堂編修所 (2019)
none	１	０	２	none			２―１	0: no nucleus; positive integer: nucleus location, counted from left to right; horizontal bar: minor break. Tokyo only.	Yamada et al. (2020)
H0	H1	none	L2	L0	L2	none		H: high register; L: low register; 0: no nucleus; positive integer: nucleus location, counted from left to right. Kyoto only.	Nakai (2026)
０	２	none	1;3	１	1;2.5	none		0: high-registered unaccented; 1: low-registered unaccented; "1;": low register (imaginary first "fall" before first mora); no "1;": high register; integer greater than 1: fall location between morae, counted from left to right; .5: fall within mora. Kyoto only.	Hirayama (2010)
none			Ⓐ	Ⓑ	none			Ⓐ: Pattern A; Ⓑ: Pattern B. Kagoshima only.	Hirayama (2010)

== Bibliography ==
- Akinaga, Kazue (20 December 1998) [25 April 1998]. 共通語のアクセント. In NHK Broadcasting Culture Research Institute (ed.). NHK日本語発音アクセント辞典 新版 (in Japanese) (5th ed.). Shibuya, Tokyo: NHK Publishing. pp. 174–221. ISBN 4-14-011112-7.
- Haraguchi, Shōsuke (September 1975). The Tone Pattern of Japanese: An Autosegmental Theory of Tonology (doctoral thesis). Cambridge, Massachusetts: Massachusetts Institute of Technology.
- Haraguchi, Shōsuke (2002) [1999]. "1. Accent". In Tsujimura, Natsuko (ed.). The Handbook of Japanese Linguistics. Malden, Massachusetts; Oxford: Blackwell Publishers. pp. 1–30. ISBN 0-631-23494-2.
- Hasegawa, Yōko (August 1999). "Pitch Accent and Vowel Devoicing in Japanese" (PDF). 14th International Congress of Phonetic Sciences. San Francisco: International Phonetic Association: 523–526.
- Hirayama, Teruo, ed. (15 September 2010) [30 June 1960]. 全国アクセント辞典 (in Japanese) (31st ed.). Chiyoda, Tokyo: Tokyodo Shuppan. ISBN 978-4-490-10023-5.
- Kibe, Nobuko (April 2012). "Comparison of Two-Pattern Accent Systems of the Southwest Kyushu Accent of Particles/Auxiliary Verbs" 西南部九州２型アクセントの特性の比較 ―助詞・助動詞のアクセントを中心として―. Journal of the Phonetic Society of Japan 音声研究 (in Japanese). 16 (1). The Phonetic Society of Japan: 80–92. doi:10.24467/onseikenkyu.16.1_80. ISSN 2189-5961.
- Kibe, Nobuko (2025). Kibe, Nobuko; Nitta, Tetsuo; Sakaki, Kan (eds.). Handbook of Japanese Dialects. Handbooks of Japanese Language and Linguistics. Vol. 7. Boston; Berlin: De Gruyter Mouton. pp. 149–179, 903–936. ISBN 978-1-5015-0841-7.
- Kibe, Nobuko (1 May 2026) [20 September 2012]. An Introduction to Japanese Accent 日本語アクセント入門 (in Japanese) (3rd ed.). Chiyoda, Tokyo: Sanseido. pp. 62–78, 94–105. ISBN 978-4-385-36531-2.
- Kindaichi, Haruhiko; Akinaga, Kazue, eds. (1 April 2025) [10 April 2014]. 新明解日本語アクセント辞典 (in Japanese) (2nd ed.). Chiyoda, Tokyo: Sanseido. ISBN 978-4-385-13468-0.
- Kitahara, Mafuyu (15 January 1999), Pitch Accent and Vowel Devoicing in Tokyo Japanese (PDF), Indiana University
- Konishi, Izumi (2025). "21 Toyama dialect". In Kibe, Nobuko; Nitta, Tetsuo; Sakaki, Kan (eds.). Handbook of Japanese Dialects. Handbooks of Japanese Language and Linguistics. Vol. 7. Boston; Berlin: De Gruyter Mouton. pp. 665–698. ISBN 978-1-5015-0841-7.
- Kōri, Shirō (1 September 2024) [1 May 2020]. 日(に)本(ほん)語(ご)のイントネーション――しくみと音(おん)読(どく)・朗(ろう)読(どく)への応(おう)用(よう) (in Japanese) (2nd ed.). Bunkyō, Tokyo: Taishukan. ISBN 978-4-469-21379-9.
- Kubozono, Haruo (2002) [1999]. "2. Mora and Syllable". In Tsujimura, Natsuko (ed.). The Handbook of Japanese Linguistics. Malden, Massachusetts; Oxford: Blackwell Publishers. pp. 31–61. ISBN 0-631-23494-2.
- Kubozono, Haruo (11 January 2018) [5 April 2006]. アクセントの法則. 岩波科学ライブラリー (in Japanese). Vol. 118 (on-demand ed.). Chiyoda, Tokyo: Iwanami Shoten. ISBN 978-4-00-730719-5.
- Kubozono, Haruo (2023). Lahiri, Aditi (ed.). Word and Sentence Prosody: The Endangered Dialect of Koshikijima Japanese (PDF). Phonology and Phonetics. Vol. 31. Berlin; Boston: De Gruyter Mouton. ISBN 978-3-11-073505-5.
- Labrune, Laurence (2012). The Phonology of Japanese. Oxford; New York: Oxford University Press. ISBN 978-0-19-9545834.
- Ladefoged, Peter Nielsen; Johnson, Keith Allan (2015) [1975]. A Course in Phonetics (7th ed.). Stamford, Connecticut: Cengage Learning. ISBN 978-1-285-46340-7.
- Maekawa, Kikuo (November 1990). "Production and Perception of the Accent in the Consecutively Devoiced Syllables in Tokyo Japanese" (PDF). First International Conference on Spoken Language Processing (ICSLP 90). National Language Research Institute: 517–520. doi:10.21437/ICSLP.1990-153.
- Maekawa, Kikuo (1997). "10 Effect of Focus on Duration and Vowel Formant Frequency in Japanese". In Sagisaka, Yoshinori; Campbell, Nick; Higuchi, Norio (eds.). Computing Prosody: Computational Models for Processing Spontaneous Speech. New York; Berlin; Heidelberg: Springer. pp. 129–153. ISBN 0-387-94804-X.
- Martin, Samuel Elmo (2004) [1975]. A Reference Grammar of Japanese (revised ed.). Honolulu: University of Hawai'i Press. ISBN 0-8248-2818-6.
- Matsumori, Akiko; Nitta, Tetsuo (1 May 2026) [20 September 2012]. 第１章 アクセントとは何か. An Introduction to Japanese Accent 日本語アクセント入門 (in Japanese) (3rd ed.). Chiyoda, Tokyo: Sanseido. pp. 8–19. ISBN 978-4-385-36531-2.
- Matsumori, Akiko (1 May 2026) [20 September 2012]. An Introduction to Japanese Accent 日本語アクセント入門 (in Japanese) (3rd ed.). Chiyoda, Tokyo: Sanseido. pp. 20–60, 80–92, 124–144. ISBN 978-4-385-36531-2.
- Matsumura, Akira; 三省堂編修所, eds. (20 September 2019). 大辞林 (in Japanese) (4th ed.). Sanseido. ISBN 978-4-385-13906-7.
- Nakai, Yukihiko (2025). "23 Kyōto dialect". In Kibe, Nobuko; Nitta, Tetsuo; Sakaki, Kan (eds.). Handbook of Japanese Dialects. Handbooks of Japanese Language and Linguistics. Vol. 7. Boston; Berlin: De Gruyter Mouton. pp. 733–778. ISBN 978-1-5015-0841-7.
- Nakai, Yukihiko (1 May 2026) [20 September 2012]. An Introduction to Japanese Accent 日本語アクセント入門 (in Japanese) (3rd ed.). Chiyoda, Tokyo: Sanseido. pp. 106–123, 146–181. ISBN 978-4-385-36531-2.
- NHK Broadcasting Culture Research Institute, ed. (20 December 1998) [25 April 1998]. NHK日本語発音アクセント辞典 新版 (in Japanese) (5th ed.). Shibuya, Tokyo: NHK Publishing. ISBN 4-14-011112-7.
- NHK Broadcasting Culture Research Institute, ed. (20 June 2025) [25 May 2016]. NHK日本語発音アクセント新辞典 (in Japanese) (15th ed.). Shibuya, Tokyo: NHK Publishing. ISBN 978-4-14-011345-5.
- Nitta, Tetsuo (1 May 2026) [20 September 2012]. An Introduction to Japanese Accent 日本語アクセント入門 (in Japanese) (3rd ed.). Chiyoda, Tokyo: Sanseido. pp. 182–215. ISBN 978-4-385-36531-2.
- Pierrehumbert, Janet Breckenridge; Beckman, Mary Esther (1988). Japanese Tone Structure. Cambridge, Massachusetts; London, England: The MIT Press. ISBN 0-262-16109-5.
- Poser, William John (1984). The Phonetics and Phonology of Tone and Intonation in Japanese (doctoral thesis). Cambridge, Massachusetts: Massachusetts Institute of Technology.
- Trask, Robert Lawrence (1996). A Dictionary of Phonetics and Phonology. Oxon, London; New York: Routledge. ISBN 0-415-11260-5.
- Sakaguchi, Itaru (December 2001). "Accentual System of the Nagasaki Dialect" 長崎方言のアクセント. Journal of the Phonetic Society of Japan 音声研究 (in Japanese). 5 (3). The Phonetic Society of Japan: 33–41. doi:10.24467/onseikenkyu.5.3_33. ISSN 2189-5961.
- Shibatani, Masayoshi (1990). The languages of Japan. Cambridge Language Surveys. Cambridge; New York; Melbourne: Cambridge University Press. ISBN 0 521 36070 6.
- Shirota, Chieko (June 1997). 日本語アクセントの習得とイントネーション ――フランス語母語話者による日本語発話の音調特徴とその要因――. 世界の日本語教育 (in Japanese) (7). Japan Foundation.
- Sugahara, Mariko (February 2003). Downtrends and post-focus intonation in Tokyo Japanese (PDF) (doctoral thesis). University of Massachusetts Amherst.
- Uwano, Zendō (9 July 2012). "Three types of accent kernels in Japanese". Lingua. 122 (13). Elsevier: 1415–1440. doi:10.1016/j.lingua.2012.07.002.
- Vance, Timothy John (1987). An Introduction to Japanese Phonology. Albany, New York: State University of New York Press. ISBN 0-88706-360-8.
- Vance, Timothy John (1995). "Final accent vs. no accent: utterance-final neutralization in Tokyo Japanese" (PDF). Journal of Phonetics. 23 (4). Elsevier: 487–499. doi:10.1006/jpho.1995.0035.
- Vance, Timothy John (October 2008). The Sounds of Japanese with Audio CD. Cambridge; New York: Cambridge University Press. ISBN 978-0-521-61754-3.
- Yamada, Tadao; Kuramochi, Yasuo; Uwano, Zendō; Yamada, Akio; Ijima, Masahiro; Sasahara, Hiroyuki, eds. (20 November 2020). 新明解国語辞典 (in Japanese) (8th ed.). Sanseido. ISBN 978-4-385-13078-1.
