= Topeng monyet =

Indonesian monkey street performance

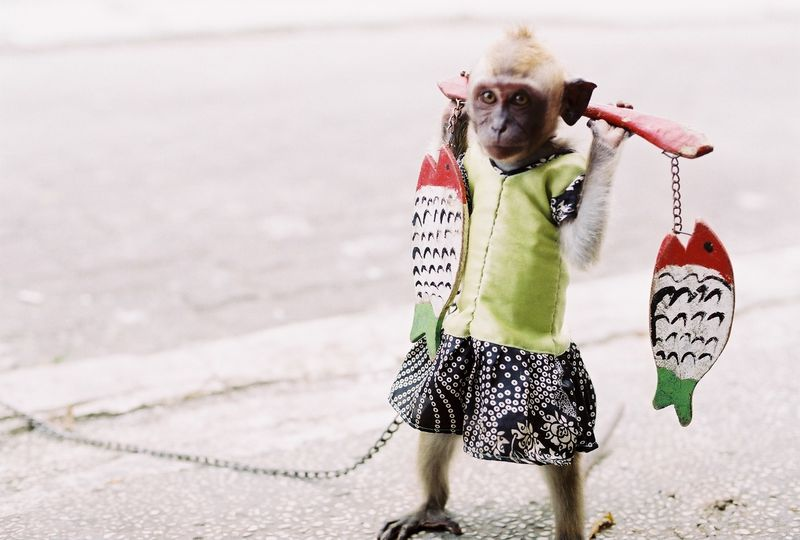
A topeng monyet performance.

Topeng monyet (English: "masked monkey") is a form of street entertainment in Indonesia where macaque monkeys are trained to do tricks. It is so named because the monkeys often wear tiny masks made of dolls' heads while performing.

According to a report in Frieze:

"Bred in captivity or captured as infants, the monkeys undergo a gruelling training process. To strengthen their hind legs they are often hung by the neck with both hands tied up for weeks on end, until they finally acquire a human-like posture, learning to handle props and perform human chores."

The practice has come under criticism from animal rights activists due to the monkeys involved often being tortured or physically disfigured in the process. It was outlawed in the Indonesian capital of Jakarta in 2013 and in all of Indonesia in 2019. The Jakarta Animal Aid Network (JAAN) has advocated banning topeng monyet.
