= Japanese pitch accent rules (verbs and adjectives) =

This article is an non-exhaustive list of rules that govern the Tokyo pitch accent of verbs and adjectives. For other rules, see Japanese pitch accent rules.

== Verbs ==
Verbs are either unaccented or minimally penultimate-accented. If the penultimate mora is deficient, an accent shift may occur:

- tōru (通る; 'goes through'): /*toŔɾɯ → tóRɾɯ/, tōsu (通す; 'lets through'): /*toŔsɯ → tóRsɯ/, mōsu (申す; 'says'): /*moŔsɯ → móRsɯ/
- hairu (入る; 'enters'): /*haíɾɯ → háiɾɯ/, mairu (参る; 'visits'): /*maíɾɯ → máiɾɯ/
- kaeru (帰る; 'goes home'): /*kaéɾɯ → káeɾɯ/, kaesu (帰す; 'lets go home'): /*kaésɯ → káesɯ/, kangaeru (考える; 'deliberates'): /kaNɡaéɾɯ → kaNɡáeɾɯ/
- tsuku (付く; 'is stuck'): /tsɯ̥́kɯ → tsɯ̥kɯ́/, fuku (吹く; 'blows'): /ɸɯ̥́kɯ → ɸɯ̥kɯ́/
- kakusu (隠す; 'conceals'): /kakɯ̥́sɯ → kakɯ̥sɯ́/, utsusu (移す; 'transfers'): /ɯtsɯ̥́sɯ → ɯtsɯ̥sɯ́/

Verbs derived from other verbs, adjectives and nouns tend to mirror those words' accent:

- From verbs:
  - uku → ukabu (浮く→浮かぶ; 'floats'): /ɯkɯ → ɯkabɯ/
  - kiru → kiseru (着る→着せる; 'puts clothes on oneself → puts clothes on someone'): /kiɾɯ → kiseɾɯ/
  - naru → narasu (鳴る→鳴らす; 'makes a sound → causes something to make a sound'): /naɾɯ → naɾasɯ/
  - naru → narasu (生る→生らす; 'grows into fruit → bears fruit'): /náɾɯ → naɾásɯ/
  - miru → mieru (見る→見える; 'sees → is visible'): /míɾɯ → miéɾɯ/
  - iku → ikiru; ikeru (生く→生きる・生ける; 'lives ~ enlivens → lives; enlivens'): /íkɯ → ikíɾɯ; ikéɾɯ/
  - nobu → nobiru; noberu (伸ぶ→伸びる・伸べる; 'extends → it extends; he extends it'): /nóbɯ → nobíɾɯ; nobéɾɯ/
- From adjectives:
  - marui → marumeru (丸い→丸める; 'is round → makes round'): /maɾɯi → maɾɯmeɾɯ/
  - nemui → nemuru (眠い→眠る; 'is sleepy → sleeps'): /nemɯi → nemɯɾɯ/
  - hosoi → hosomeru / hosoru (細い→細める・細る; 'is narrow/thin → narrows / becomes thin'): /hosói → hosoméɾɯ / hosóɾɯ/
  - hosoi → oshimu (惜しい→惜しむ; 'is regrettable → regrets'): /oɕíR → oɕímɯ/
- From common nouns:
  - kubo → kubomu (窪→窪む; 'a hollow → becomes hollow'): /kɯbo → kɯbomɯ/
  - hara → haramu (腹→孕む; 'a belly → becomes pregnant'): /haɾá → haɾámɯ/
  - kumo → kumoru (雲→曇る; 'cloud → becomes cloudy'): /kɯ́mo → kɯmóɾɯ/
  - riki → rikimu (力→力む; 'strength → exerts oneself excessively'): /ɾíki → ɾikímɯ/
  - taiji → taijiru (退治→退治る; 'extermination → exterminates'): /taiʑi ~ táiʑi → taiʑiɾɯ ~ taiʑíɾɯ/
  - bōri → boru (暴利→ぼる; 'excessive profit → profits excessively'): /bóRɾi → bóɾɯ/
  - demo → demoru (デモ→デモる; 'protest → protests'): /démo → demóɾɯ/
  - daburu (ダブル→ダブる; 'double → is duplicated'): /dábɯɾɯ → dabɯ́ɾɯ/
  - panikku → panikuru (パニック→パニクる; 'panic → panics'): /pániQkɯ ~ paníQkɯ → panikɯ́ɾɯ/
- From adjectival nouns:
  - yasuraka → yasuragu (安らか→安らぐ; 'peaceful → is at peace'): /jasɯ́ɾaka → jasɯɾáɡɯ/
  - yawaraka → yawaragu (柔らか→和らぐ; 'soft → softens'): /jawáɾaka ~ jawaɾáka ~ jawaɾaká → jawaɾáɡɯ/

=== Verbal-infinitive–verb compounds ===
Compound verbs can be created by combining an infinitive modifier and a head verb. In general, if the infinitive is originally unaccented, the compound verb is accented:

- kai + ageru → kaiageru (買い+上げる→買い上げる; 'buying + raises → buys up'): /kai + aɡeɾɯ → kaiaɡéɾɯ/
- kai + naosu → kainaosu (買い+直す→買い直す; 'buying + mends → buys anew'): /kai + naósɯ → kainaósɯ/
- ki + naosu → kinaosu (着+直す→着直す; 'wearing + mends → changes clothes'): /ki + naósɯ → kinaósɯ/
- ki + kaeru → kikaeru (着+替える→着替える; 'wearing + changes → changes clothes'): /ki + kaeɾɯ → ki̥kaéɾɯ → ki̥káeɾɯ/

If the infinitive is originally accented, the compound verb traditionally tends to be unaccented, but nowadays they can also be accented. Shorter and/or more commonly used verbs are more resistant to accentuation.

- kaki + yamu → kakiyamu (書き+止む→書き止む; 'writing + stops → stops writing'): /káki + jamɯ → kakijamɯ ~ kakijámɯ/
- kaki + dasu → kakidasu (書き+出す→書き出す; 'writing + lets out → starts writing'): /káki + dásɯ → kakidásɯ ~ kakidasɯ/
- de + aruku → dearuku (出+歩く→出歩く; 'exiting + walks → roams'): /dé + aɾɯ́kɯ → deaɾɯkɯ ~ deaɾɯ́kɯ/
- de + naosu → denaosu (出+直す→出直す; 'exiting + mends → starts afresh'): /dé + naósɯ → denaosɯ ~ denaósɯ/
- mi + nuku → minuku (見+抜く→見抜く; 'seeing + pulls out → sees through'): /mí + nɯkɯ → minɯ́kɯ ~ minɯkɯ/
- ochi + tsuku → ochitsuku (落ち+着く→落ち着く; 'falling + arrives → settles down'): /ócɕi + {tsɯ̥́kɯ → tsɯ̥kɯ́} → ocɕitsɯ̥kɯ/

The inverse correlation between the accent types of compound verbs and their infintive modifiers has been dubbed Yamada's law (山田の法則, Yamada no hōsoku), after its discoverer Yamada Bimyō.

Some infinitives with intense meanings may bear the accent, although they are increasingly regularized as penultimate-accented:

- koi + negau → koinegau (乞い+願う→冀う; 'begging + wishes → begs'): /kói + neɡáɯ → kóineɡaɯ ~ kói | neɡáɯ ~ koineɡáɯ/
- tataki + tsukeru → tatakitsukeru (叩き+付ける→叩き付ける; 'slapping + sticks → slams'): /tatáki + tsɯ̥kéɾɯ → tatakitsɯ̥kéɾɯ ~ tatákitsɯ̥keɾɯ/
- itame + tsukeru → tatakitsukeru (痛め+付ける→痛め付ける; 'hurting + sticks → torments'): /itáme + tsɯ̥kéɾɯ → itámetsɯ̥keɾɯ/
- more + kiku → morekiku (漏れ+聞く→漏れ聞く; 'leaking + hears → overhears'): /móɾe + ki̥kɯ → moɾeki̥kɯ ~ móɾeki̥kɯ/

=== Adjectival-stem–verb compounds ===
Most adjectival-stem–verb compound verbs are accented, although some are increasingly unaccented: chikazuku (近付く; /cɕi̥kazɯ́kɯ ~ cɕi̥kazɯkɯ/ 'approaches'), chikazukeru (近付ける; /cɕi̥kazɯkéɾɯ ~ cɕi̥kazɯkeɾɯ/ 'brings close together'), tōnoku (遠退く; /toRnókɯ/ 'goes into the distance'), etc.

Compounds with sugiru (過ぎる; 'exceeds') are traditionally unaccented and increasingly accented:, ōsugiru (多過ぎる; /oRsɯɡiɾɯ ~ oRsɯɡíɾɯ/ 'is too abundant'), takasugiru (高過ぎる; /takasɯɡiɾɯ ~ takasɯɡíɾɯ/ 'is too expensive'), etc.

=== Noun–verb compounds ===
Most noun–verb compound verbs are accented, often with rendaku:

- iro + tsuku → irozuku (色+付く→色付く; 'color + is stuck → becomes colored'): /iɾó + tsɯ̥́kɯ ~ tsɯ̥kɯ́ → iɾozɯ́kɯ/
- kizu + tsukeru → kizutsukeru (傷+付ける→傷付ける; 'a wound + sticks → wounds'): /kizɯ + tsɯ̥kéɾɯ → kizɯtsɯ̥kéɾɯ/
- kokoro + sasu → kokorozasu (心+指す→志す; 'a mind + points → intends'): /kokóɾo ~ kokoɾó + sásɯ → kokoɾozásɯ/
- michi + hiku → michibiku (道+引く→導く; 'a road + pulls → guides'): /micɕi + hi̥kɯ → micɕibíkɯ/
- me + toru → metoru (妻+取る→娶る; 'female + takes → marries a woman'): /mé + tóɾɯ → metóɾɯ/

=== S‑irregular verbs ===
S-irregular (サ変, sa-hen) verbs can behave as single words, or simply nouns followed by the verb suru (する; /sɯɾɯ/ 'does'). See Japanese conjugation § The bases of suru for more.

==== ‑zuru, ‑jiru ====
Verbs ending in ‑zuru have interchangeable unigrade (一段, ichidan) variants with ‑jiru.

If the Sino-Japanese stem contains /R/ or /ei ~ eR/, the verb tends to be unaccented, although some verbs are increasingly accented as well: shōzuru (生ずる; /ɕoRzɯɾɯ ~ ɕoRzɯ́ɾɯ/ 'produces'), tsūzuru (通ずる; /tsɯRzɯɾɯ/ 'passes through'), meizuru (命ずる; /meizɯɾɯ ~ meRzɯɾɯ ~ meizɯ́ɾɯ ~ meRzɯ́ɾɯ/ 'orders'), etc.

If the Sino-Japanese stem contains /N/, the verb are equally likely unaccented and accented: anzuru (案ずる; /aNzɯɾɯ ~ aNzɯ́ɾɯ/ 'ponders'), shinzuru (信ずる; /ɕiNzɯ́ɾɯ ~ ɕiNzɯɾɯ/ 'believes'), sonzuru (損ずる; /soNzɯ́ɾɯ ~ soNzɯɾɯ/ 'damages'), etc.

If the native stem contains /N/, the verb is almost always accented:

- amami → amanzuru (甘み→甘んずる; 'sweetness → is contented'): /amami → amaNzɯ́ɾɯ ~ amaNzɯɾɯ/
- omomi → omonzuru (重み→重んずる; 'weight → takes seriously'): /omomi → omoNzɯ́ɾɯ ~ omoNzɯɾɯ/
- saki ni → sakinzuru (先に→先んずる; 'to begin with → goes ahead'): /saki ni → sakiNzɯ́ɾɯ ~ sakiNzɯɾɯ/
- sora ni → soranzuru (空に→諳んずる; 'in the sky → recites from memory'): /sóɾa ni → soɾaNzɯ́ɾɯ/

==== ‑suru, ‑su ====
Some verbs ending in ‑suru have interchangeable quinquegrade (五段, godan) variants with ‑su.

If the Sino-Japanese stem is unimoraic, the verb is always accented:

- kasuru → kasu (化する・呵する・架する・科する・嫁する・課する→化す・呵す・架す・科す・嫁す・課す): /kasɯ́ɾɯ → kásɯ/
- kisuru → kisu (帰する・記する・期する→帰す・記す・期す): /ki̥sɯ́ɾɯ → kí̥sɯ/

If the Sino-Japanese stem ends in /Q/, the verb is traditionally unaccented and increasingly accented as well: nessuru (熱する; /neQsɯɾɯ ~ neQsɯ́ɾɯ/ 'makes hot'), hassuru (発する; /haQsɯɾɯ ~ haQsɯ́ɾɯ/ 'gives out')

- tassuru → tassu (達する→達す; 'reaches'): /taQsɯɾɯ ~ taQsɯ́ɾɯ → taQsɯ/

If the Sino-Japanese stem is bimoraic without /Q/, the verb tends to be accented: kansuru (刊する・冠する・姦する・管する・箝する・関する・緘する・擐する・鑑する; /kaNsɯ́ɾɯ/), kyūsuru (休する・給する・窮する; /kjɯRsɯ́ɾɯ/), kōsuru (抗する・校する・航する・寇する・稿する; /koRsɯ́ɾɯ/)

- hakusuru → hakusu (泊する・博する→泊す・博す): /hakɯ̥sɯ́ɾɯ → hakɯ̥́sɯ/
- aisuru → aisu (愛する→愛す; 'loves'): /aisɯ́ɾɯ → áisɯ/
- kaisuru → kaisu (介する・会する・解する→介す・会す・解す): /kaisɯ́ɾɯ → káisɯ/

The majority of other verbs are merely words or phrases followed by the unaccented verb suru (する; /sɯɾɯ/). In these cases, only the words' or phrases' accent is relevant:

- tabi → tabi suru (旅→旅する; 'travel → travels'): /tabí → tabí sɯɾɯ/
- nori → nori suru (糊→糊する; 'glue → glues'): /noɾí → noɾí sɯɾɯ ~ noɾisɯ́ɾɯ/
- ase → ase suru (汗→旅する; 'sweat → sweats'): /áse → áse sɯɾɯ/
- koi → koi suru (恋→恋する; 'love → falls in love'): /kói → kói sɯɾɯ ~ koisɯ́ɾɯ/
- baka → baka ni suru (馬鹿→馬鹿にする; 'a fool → makes a fool of'): /báka → báka ni sɯɾɯ/
- kokoro → kokoro suru (心→心する; 'a mind → keeps in mind'): /kokóɾo → kokóɾo sɯɾɯ/
- namida → namida suru (涙→涙する; 'tears → shed tears'): /námida → námida sɯɾɯ/
- watakushi → watakushi suru (私→私する; 'private → embezzles'): /watakɯ̥ɕi → watakɯ̥ɕi sɯɾɯ/
- toku → toku suru (得→得する; 'gain → gains'): /tokɯ → tokɯ̥ sɯɾɯ/
- son → son suru (損→損する; 'loss → loses'): /sóN → sóN sɯɾɯ/
- mu → mu ni suru (無→無にする; 'naught → makes into naught'): /mɯ́ → mɯ́ ni sɯɾɯ/
- kakugo → kakugo suru (覚悟→覚悟する; 'readiness → is ready'): /kákɯɡo ~ kakɯ́ɡo → kákɯɡo sɯɾɯ ~ kakɯ́ɡo sɯɾɯ/
- kika → kika suru (帰化→帰化する; 'naturalization → becomes naturalized'): /kí̥ka ~ ki̥ká → kí̥ka sɯɾɯ ~ ki̥ká sɯɾɯ/
- annai → annai suru (案内→案内する; 'guidance → guides'): /aNnái → aNnái sɯɾɯ/
- kurō → kurō suru (苦労→苦労する; 'trouble → has trouble'): /kɯ́ɾoR → kɯ́ɾoR sɯɾɯ/
- omitto → omitto suru (オミット→オミットする; 'omits'): /omíQto → omíQto sɯɾɯ/
- gōru in → gōru in suru (ゴールイン→ゴールインする; 'attainment of a goal → attains a goal'): /ɡoɾɯ́iN → ɡoɾɯ́iN sɯɾɯ/
- bakku → bakku suru (バック→バックする; 'back → backs off'): /báQkɯ → báQkɯ̥ sɯɾɯ/
- hassuru → hassuru suru (ハッスル→ハッスルする; 'hustle → hustles'): /háQsɯɾɯ → háQsɯɾɯ sɯɾɯ/
- dokidoki → dokidoki suru (どきどき→どきどきする; 'badum → thumps'): /dókidoki → dókidoki̥ sɯɾɯ/
- yoku → yoku suru (良く→良くする; 'being good → is good'): /jókɯ → jókɯ̥ sɯɾɯ/
- {mattaku → mattō} → mattō suru ({全く→全う}→全うする; '{entirely} → accomplishes'): /{maQtakɯ → maQtoR} → maQtoR sɯɾɯ/
- {hitoshiku → hitoshiku suru} → {hitoshū → hitoshū suru} ({等しく→等しくする}→{等しゅう→等しゅうする}; '{being equal → equalizes}'): /{hi̥tóɕi̥kɯ ~ hi̥toɕí̥kɯ → hi̥tóɕi̥kɯ̥ sɯɾɯ ~ hi̥toɕíkɯ̥ sɯɾɯ} → {hi̥tóɕɯR ~ hi̥toɕɯ́R → hi̥tóɕɯR sɯɾɯ ~ hi̥toɕɯ́R sɯɾɯ}/
- But: naku → nakusuru → nakusu (無く→無くする→無くす; 'being nonexistent → mislays'): /nákɯ → nakɯ̥sɯɾɯ → nakɯ̥sɯ/

The polite structure o‑<infinitive> suru in particular is unaccented:

- sasoi → osasoi suru (誘い→お誘いする; 'inviting → invites'): /sasoi → osasoi sɯɾɯ/
- machi → omachi suru (待ち→お待ちする; 'waiting → waits'): /mácɕi → omacɕi̥ sɯɾɯ/

=== Conjugational verbal forms ===
As mentioned above, verbs, specifically imperfect conclusives (終止形, shūshikei; aka "dictionary forms")/attributives (連体形, rentaikei), are either unaccented or minimally penultimate-accented. Other forms behave similarly, with some caveats:

- Quinquegrade infinitives (連用形, ren'yōkei) work the same as imperfect conclusives. Non-quinquegrade infinitives, on the other hand, are one mora shorter than their imperfect conclusives, which may result in initial-accented unimoraic infinitives, or infinitives with accent shifts.
- Imperatives (命令形, meireikei) of unaccented imperfect conclusives are final-accented, which only surfaces before a particle. Imperatives with ‑ro work like single words and are penultimate-accented, but those with ‑yo work like separate penultimate-accented imperatives followed by the particle yo.
- Potentials (可能動詞, kanō dōshi) are simply verbs derived from verbs, and work as mentioned above.
- The classical pronunciations listed here are traditional, with western vowel fusions. See Japanese conjugation (imperfective form) § Conjugation table for more.

Verb type			Modern conclusive	Modern attributive	Classical attributive	Classical conclusive	Infinitive	Modern eastern imperative	Classical imperative	Potential
Unaccented	Modern quinquegrade Classical quadrigrade/n‑irregular	kau (買う; 'buys')	/kaɯ/		/koR/		/kai/	/kaé/		/kaeɾɯ/
Unaccented	Modern quinquegrade Classical quadrigrade/n‑irregular	yuu → yū (結う; 'ties hair')	/jɯɯ → jɯR/ [jɨ́ɯ̈́ → jɨ́ɨ́]		/jɯR/ [jɨ́ɨ́]		/jɯi/	/jɯé/		/jɯeɾɯ/
Unaccented	Modern quinquegrade Classical quadrigrade/n‑irregular	yū (言う; 'says')	/jɯR/ [jɨː]				/iR/	/ié/		/ieɾɯ/
Unaccented	Modern quinquegrade Classical quadrigrade/n‑irregular	yuku → iku (行く; 'goes')	/jɯkɯ → ikɯ/		/jɯkɯ/		/jɯki → iki/	/jɯké → iké/		/jɯkeɾɯ → ikeɾɯ/
Unaccented	Modern quinquegrade Classical quadrigrade/n‑irregular	naru (鳴る; 'makes a sound')	/naɾɯ/				/naɾi/	/naɾé/		/naɾeɾɯ/
Unaccented	Modern quinquegrade Classical quadrigrade/n‑irregular	furu (振る; 'shakes')	/ɸɯɾɯ/				/ɸɯɾi/	/ɸɯɾé/		/ɸɯɾeɾɯ/
Unaccented	Modern quinquegrade Classical quadrigrade/n‑irregular	shinu (死ぬ; 'dies')	/ɕinɯ/		/ɕinɯɾɯ/	/ɕinɯ/	/ɕini/	/ɕiné/		/ɕineɾɯ/
Unaccented	Modern unigrade Classical unigrade/bigrade	iru (居る; 'exists')	/iɾɯ/				/i/	/iɾó/	/í jo ~ ijó/	
Unaccented	Modern unigrade Classical unigrade/bigrade	hareru (腫れる; 'swells')	/haɾeɾɯ/		/haɾɯɾɯ/	/haɾɯ/	/haɾe/	/haɾeɾó/	/haɾé jo/	
Unaccented	Modern unigrade Classical unigrade/bigrade	mochīru (用いる; 'uses')	/mocɕiRɾɯ/				/mocɕiR/	/mocɕiRɾó/	/mocɕií jo/	
Unaccented	S‑irregular	suru (する; 'does')	/sɯɾɯ/			/sɯ/	/ɕi/	/ɕiɾó/	/sé jo/	
Unaccented	Quinquegradified	tassu(ru) (達す(る); 'reaches')	/taQsɯ(ɾɯ)/		/taQsɯɾɯ/	/taQsɯ/	/taQɕi/	/taQɕiɾó/	/taQsé jo, taQsé/	/taQseɾɯ/
Unaccented	Unigradified	ronzuru, ronjiru (論ずる・論じる; 'discusses')	/ɾoNzɯɾɯ, ɾoNʑiɾɯ/		/ɾoNzɯɾɯ/	/ɾoNzɯ/	/ɾoNʑi/	/ɾoNʑiɾó/	/ɾoNzé jo, ɾoNʑí jo/	
Accented	Modern quinquegrade Classical quadrigrade/r‑irregular	kau (飼う; 'rears')	/káɯ/		/kóR/		/kái/	/káe/		/kaéɾɯ/
Accented	Modern quinquegrade Classical quadrigrade/r‑irregular	yuu → yū (結う; 'ties hair')	/jɯ́ɯ → jɯ́R/ [jɨ́ɯ̈̀ → jɨ́ɨ̀]		/jɯ́R/ [jɨ́ɨ̀]		/jɯ́i/	/jɯ́e/		/jɯéɾɯ/
Accented	Modern quinquegrade Classical quadrigrade/r‑irregular	naru (成る; 'succeeds')	/náɾɯ/				/náɾi/	/náɾe/		/naɾéɾɯ/
Accented	Modern quinquegrade Classical quadrigrade/r‑irregular	aru (有る; 'exists')	/áɾɯ/			/áɾi/		/áɾe/		/aɾéɾɯ/
Accented	Modern quinquegrade Classical quadrigrade/r‑irregular	de aru → da (である→だ; 'is')	/de | áɾɯ → da/	/de | áɾɯ/ /náɾɯ → na/			/de | áɾi/	/de | áɾe/		
Accented	Modern quinquegrade Classical quadrigrade/r‑irregular	‑ta / ‑da (た・だ)	/ita/ /joNda/	/itáɾɯ → ita/ /joNdáɾɯ (Note: Pseudo-classical.) → joNda/	/ítaɾɯ ~ itáɾɯ/ /jobítaɾɯ ~ jobitáɾɯ/	/ítaɾi ~ itáɾi/ /jobítaɾi ~ jobitáɾi/			/ítaɾe ~ itáɾe/ /jobítaɾe ~ jobitáɾe/	
Accented	Modern quinquegrade Classical quadrigrade/r‑irregular	‑ta / ‑da (た・だ)	/íta/ /jóNda/	/ítaɾɯ → íta/ /jóNdaɾɯ → jóNda/	/ítaɾɯ/ /jómitaɾɯ/	/ítaɾi/ /jómitaɾi/			/ítaɾe/ /jómitaɾe/	
Accented	Modern quinquegrade Classical quadrigrade/r‑irregular	furu (降る; 'descends')	/ɸɯ́ɾɯ/				/ɸɯ́ɾi/	/ɸɯ́ɾe/		/ɸɯɾéɾɯ/
Accented	Modern quinquegrade Classical quadrigrade/r‑irregular	utsuru (移る; 'is transferred')	/ɯtsɯ́ɾɯ/				/ɯtsɯ́ɾi/	/ɯtsɯ́ɾe/		/ɯtsɯɾéɾɯ/
Accented	Modern quinquegrade Classical quadrigrade/r‑irregular	tsuku (付く; 'is stuck')	/tsɯ̥́kɯ → tsɯ̥kɯ́/				/tsɯ̥́ki → tsɯ̥kí/	/tsɯ̥́ke → tsɯ̥ké/		/tsɯ̥kéɾɯ/
Accented	Modern quinquegrade Classical quadrigrade/r‑irregular	fusu (伏す; 'lies face-down')	/ɸɯ̥́sɯ → ɸɯ̥sɯ́/				/ɸɯ̥́ɕi → ɸɯ̥ɕí/	/ɸɯ̥́se → ɸɯ̥sé/		/ɸɯ̥séɾɯ/
Accented	Modern quinquegrade Classical quadrigrade/r‑irregular	kakusu (隠す; 'conceals')	/kakɯ̥́sɯ → kakɯ̥sɯ́/				/kakɯ̥́ɕi → kakɯ̥ɕí/	/kakɯ̥́se → kakɯ̥sé/		/kakɯ̥séɾɯ/
Accented	Modern quinquegrade Classical quadrigrade/r‑irregular	tōru (通る; 'goes through')	/tóRɾɯ/				/tóRɾi/	/tóRɾe/		/toRɾéɾɯ/
Accented	Modern quinquegrade Classical quadrigrade/r‑irregular	kaeru (帰る; 'goes home')	/káeɾɯ/				/káeɾi/	/káeɾe/		/kaeɾéɾɯ/
Accented	Modern unigrade Classical unigrade/bigrade	iru (射る; 'shoots')	/íɾɯ/				/í/	/íɾo/	/íjo/	
Accented	Modern unigrade Classical unigrade/bigrade	eru (得る; 'gets')	/éɾɯ/		/ɯ́ɾɯ/	/ɯ́/	/é/	/éɾo/	/éjo/	
Accented	Modern unigrade Classical unigrade/bigrade	hareru (晴れる; 'clears up')	/haɾéɾɯ/		/haɾɯ́ɾɯ/	/háɾɯ/	/háɾe/	/haɾéɾo/	/háɾe jo ~ haɾéjo/	
Accented	Modern unigrade Classical unigrade/bigrade	mochiiru (用いる; 'uses')	/mocɕiíɾɯ/				/mocɕíR/	/mocɕiíɾo/	/mocɕíR jo ~ mocɕiíjo/	
Accented	Modern unigrade Classical unigrade/bigrade	kangaeru (考える; 'deliberates')	/kaNɡaéɾɯ → kaNɡáeɾɯ/		/kaNɡóRɾɯ/	/kaNɡóR/	/kaNɡáe/	/kaNɡaéɾo → kaNɡáeɾo/	/kaNɡáe jo ~ kaNɡaéjo/	
Accented	Modern unigrade Classical unigrade/bigrade	mōkeru (設ける; 'establishes')	/moRkéɾɯ/		/moRkɯ́ɾɯ/	/móRkɯ/	/móRke/	/moRkéɾo/	/móRke jo ~ moRkéjo/	
Accented	Quinquegradified	nasa(re)ru (為さ(れ)る; 'does')	/nasáɾɯ, nasaɾéɾɯ/		/nasáɾɯ, nasaɾɯ́ɾɯ/	/nasáɾɯ/	/nasáɾi, nasáɾe/	/nasái ~ nasáɾe, nasaɾéɾo/	/nasáɾe, nasáɾe jo ~ nasaɾéjo/	/nasaɾéɾɯ/
Accented	S‑irregular	‑masu(ru) (ます(る))	/nasa(ɾ)imásɯ, nasa(ɾ)imasɯ́ɾɯ/					/nasa(ɾ)imáse ~ nasa(ɾ)imáɕi/		
Accented	S‑irregular	de arimasu(ru) → desu (であります(る)→です; 'is')	/de | aɾimásɯ → désɯ, de | aɾimasɯ́ɾɯ/					/de | aɾimáse ~ de | aɾimáɕi/		
Accented	Quinquegradified	kasu(ru) (課す(る); 'assigns')	/kasɯ́ɾɯ, kásɯ/		/kasɯ́ɾɯ/	/kásɯ/	/káɕi/	/kaɕíɾo, káse/	/káse jo ~ kaséjo/	/kaséɾɯ/
Accented	Quinquegradified	aisu(ru) (愛す(る); 'loves')	/aisɯ́ɾɯ, áisɯ/		/aisɯ́ɾɯ/	/áisɯ/	/áiɕi/	/aiɕíɾo, áise/	/áise jo ~ aiséjo/	/aiséɾɯ/
Accented	Unigradified	ronzuru, ronjiru (論ずる・論じる; 'discusses')	/ɾoNzɯ́ɾɯ, ɾoNʑíɾɯ/		/ɾoNzɯ́ɾɯ/	/ɾóNʑɯ/	/ɾóNʑi/	/ɾoNʑíɾo/	/ɾóNze jo ~ ɾoNzéjo, ɾóNʑi jo ~ ɾoNʑíjo/	
Accented	K‑irregular	kuru (来る; 'comes')	/kɯ́ɾɯ/			/kɯ́/	/kí/	/kói/	/kójo/	
Accented	Unigradified	dekiru (出来る; 'comes into existence')	/dekíɾɯ/		/dekɯ́ɾɯ/	/dékɯ/	/déki/		/déko jo ~ dekójo/	

==== Verbal conclusive/attributive + particle ====
Particles following conclusives or attributives can be classified into the following groups (asterisked particles belong to more than one group):

- Recessive and preaccenting (RecPre): ka / ka i / ka na (doubt) / ka ne, ga* (case, conjunction), sa, shi, ze*, zo*, to* (quotation, enumeration) / to ka* / to te* / tte / to mo*, na (prohibition), ni*, no / no de / n de / no ni, wa* (は), mo*, ya, yo*, wa (yo) (わ(よ)), o*, kara, sae*, shika*, sura*, da no, nado / na n te, nara(ba), nari*, yara, yori* / yori ka* / yori mo*, kashira, keredo (mo)
- Recessive and unaccented (Rec0): ga* (case), to*, na (admiration), ni*, wa* (は), mo*, yo*, o*, kiri, shika*, dake*, hodo, mono no
  - Unlike the final-accented mono below, mono no is generally unaccented. See Japanese pitch accent rules §§ Noun + particle and No for more.
- Recessive and final-accented (Rec−1): ze*, zo*, ne, yue*, mono
- Recessive and initial-accented (Rec+1): ka na (exclamation), sae*, sura*, to ka* / to te* / to mo*, nā, nari*, nē, nomi, made, mon, yue*, yori* / yori ka* / yori mo*, kurai* / gurai*, dokoro (ka)*, bakari*
  - Mon is the reduced form of the final-accented mono above. It is necessarily initial-accented as its last mora is /N/.
- Dominant and initial-accented (Dom+1): kurai* / gurai*, dokoro (ka)*, bakari*
- Dominant and deaccenting (DomDe): dake*

Verb type			Modern conclusive/attributive	RecPre	Rec0	Rec−1	Rec+1	Dom+1	DomDe
Unaccented	Modern quinquegrade Classical quadrigrade/n‑irregular	kau (買う; 'buys')	/kaɯ/	/kaɯ́ to/ /kaɯ́ zo/	/kaɯ to/ /kaɯ dake/ /kaɯ mono no/	/kaɯ zó/ /kaɯ monó/	/kaɯ ɡɯ́ɾai/ /kaɯ móN/	/kaɯ ɡɯ́ɾai/	/kaɯ dake/
Unaccented	Modern quinquegrade Classical quadrigrade/n‑irregular	yuu → yū (結う; 'ties hair')	/jɯɯ → jɯR/	/jɯɯ́ to/ /jɯɯ́ zo/	/jɯɯ to → jɯR to/ /jɯɯ dake → jɯR dake/ /jɯɯ mono no → jɯR mono no/	/jɯɯ zó → jɯR zó/ /jɯɯ monó → jɯR monó/	/jɯɯ ɡɯ́ɾai → jɯR ɡɯ́ɾai/ /jɯɯ móN → jɯR móN/	/jɯɯ ɡɯ́ɾai → jɯR ɡɯ́ɾai/	/jɯɯ dake → jɯR dake/
Unaccented	Modern quinquegrade Classical quadrigrade/n‑irregular	yū (言う; 'says')	/jɯR/	/jɯ́R to/ /jɯ́R zo/	/jɯR to/ /jɯR dake/ /jɯR mono no/	/jɯR zó/ /jɯR monó/	/jɯR ɡɯ́ɾai/ /jɯR móN/	/jɯR ɡɯ́ɾai/	/jɯR dake/
Unaccented	Modern quinquegrade Classical quadrigrade/n‑irregular	yuku → iku (行く; 'goes')	/jɯkɯ → ikɯ/	/jɯkɯ̥́ to → ikɯ̥́ to/ /jɯkɯ́ zo → ikɯ́ zo/	/jɯkɯ̥ to → ikɯ̥ to/ /jɯkɯ dake → ikɯ dake/ /jɯkɯ mono no → ikɯ mono no/	/jɯkɯ zó → ikɯ zó/ /jɯkɯ monó → ikɯ monó/	/jɯkɯ ɡɯ́ɾai → ikɯ ɡɯ́ɾai/ /jɯkɯ móN → ikɯ móN/	/jɯkɯ ɡɯ́ɾai → ikɯ ɡɯ́ɾai/	/jɯkɯ dake → ikɯ dake/
Unaccented	Modern quinquegrade Classical quadrigrade/n‑irregular	naru (鳴る; 'makes a sound')	/naɾɯ/	/naɾɯ́ to/ /naɾɯ́ zo/	/naɾɯ to/ /naɾɯ dake/ /naɾɯ mono no/	/naɾɯ zó/ /naɾɯ monó/	/naɾɯ ɡɯ́ɾai/ /naɾɯ móN/	/naɾɯ ɡɯ́ɾai/	/naɾɯ dake/
Unaccented	Modern quinquegrade Classical quadrigrade/n‑irregular	furu (振る; 'shakes')	/ɸɯɾɯ/	/ɸɯɾɯ́ to/ /ɸɯɾɯ́ zo/	/ɸɯɾɯ to/ /ɸɯɾɯ dake/ /ɸɯɾɯ mono no/	/ɸɯɾɯ zó/ /ɸɯɾɯ monó/	/ɸɯɾɯ ɡɯ́ɾai/ /ɸɯɾɯ móN/	/ɸɯɾɯ ɡɯ́ɾai/	/ɸɯɾɯ dake/
Unaccented	Modern quinquegrade Classical quadrigrade/n‑irregular	shinu (死ぬ; 'dies')	/ɕinɯ/	/ɕinɯ́ to/ /ɕinɯ́ zo/	/ɕinɯ to/ /ɕinɯ dake/ /ɕinɯ mono no/	/ɕinɯ zó/ /ɕinɯ monó/	/ɕinɯ ɡɯ́ɾai/ /ɕinɯ móN/	/ɕinɯ ɡɯ́ɾai/	/ɕinɯ dake/
Unaccented	Modern unigrade Classical unigrade/bigrade	iru (居る; 'exists')	/iɾɯ/	/iɾɯ́ to/ /iɾɯ́ zo/	/iɾɯ to/ /iɾɯ dake/ /iɾɯ mono no/	/iɾɯ zó/ /iɾɯ monó/	/iɾɯ ɡɯ́ɾai/ /iɾɯ móN/	/iɾɯ ɡɯ́ɾai/	/iɾɯ dake/
Unaccented	Modern unigrade Classical unigrade/bigrade	hareru (腫れる; 'swells')	/haɾeɾɯ/	/haɾeɾɯ́ to/ /haɾeɾɯ́ zo/	/haɾeɾɯ to/ /haɾeɾɯ dake/ /haɾeɾɯ mono no/	/haɾeɾɯ zó/ /haɾeɾɯ monó/	/haɾeɾɯ ɡɯ́ɾai/ /haɾeɾɯ móN/	/haɾeɾɯ ɡɯ́ɾai/	/haɾeɾɯ dake/
Unaccented	Modern unigrade Classical unigrade/bigrade	mochīru (用いる; 'uses')	/mocɕiRɾɯ/	/mocɕiRɾɯ́ to/ /mocɕiRɾɯ́ zo/	/mocɕiRɾɯ to/ /mocɕiRɾɯ dake/ /mocɕiRɾɯ mono no/	/mocɕiRɾɯ zó/ /mocɕiRɾɯ monó/	/mocɕiRɾɯ ɡɯ́ɾai/ /mocɕiRɾɯ móN/	/mocɕiRɾɯ ɡɯ́ɾai/	/mocɕiRɾɯ dake/
Unaccented	S‑irregular	suru (する; 'does')	/sɯɾɯ/	/sɯɾɯ́ to/ /sɯɾɯ́ zo/	/sɯɾɯ to/ /sɯɾɯ dake/ /sɯɾɯ mono no/	/sɯɾɯ zó/ /sɯɾɯ monó/	/sɯɾɯ ɡɯ́ɾai/ /sɯɾɯ móN/	/sɯɾɯ ɡɯ́ɾai/	/sɯɾɯ dake/
Unaccented	Quinquegradified	tassu(ru) (達す(る); 'reaches')	/taQsɯ(ɾɯ)/	/taQsɯɾɯ́ to, taQsɯ̥́ to/ /taQsɯɾɯ́ zo, taQsɯ́ zo/	/taQsɯɾɯ to, taQsɯ̥ to/ /taQsɯ(ɾɯ) dake/ /taQsɯ(ɾɯ) mono no/	/taQsɯ(ɾɯ) zó/ /taQsɯ(ɾɯ) monó/	/taQsɯ(ɾɯ) ɡɯ́ɾai/ /taQsɯ(ɾɯ) móN/	/taQsɯ(ɾɯ) ɡɯ́ɾai/	/taQsɯ(ɾɯ) dake/
Unaccented	Unigradified	ronzuru, ronjiru (論ずる・論じる; 'discusses')	/ɾoNzɯɾɯ, ɾoNʑiɾɯ/	/ɾoNzɯɾɯ́ to, ɾoNʑiɾɯ́ to/ /ɾoNzɯɾɯ́ zo, ɾoNʑiɾɯ́ zo/	/ɾoNzɯɾɯ to, ɾonʑiɾɯ to/ /ɾoNzɯɾɯ dake, ɾonʑiɾɯ dake/ /ɾoNzɯɾɯ mono no, ɾonʑiɾɯ mono no/	/ɾoNzɯɾɯ zó, ɾonʑiɾɯ zó/ /ɾoNzɯɾɯ monó, ɾonʑiɾɯ monó/	/ɾoNzɯɾɯ ɡɯ́ɾai, ɾoNʑiɾɯ ɡɯ́ɾai/ /ɾoNzɯɾɯ móN, ɾonʑiɾɯ móN/	/ɾoNzɯɾɯ ɡɯ́ɾai, ɾoNʑiɾɯ ɡɯ́ɾai/	/ɾoNzɯɾɯ dake, ɾoNʑiɾɯ dake/
Accented	Modern quinquegrade Classical quadrigrade/r‑irregular	kau (飼う; 'rears')	/káɯ/	/káɯ to/ /káɯ zo/	/káɯ to/ /káɯ dake/ /káɯ mono no/	/káɯ zo/ /káɯ mono/	/káɯ ɡɯɾai ~ káɯ | ɡɯ́ɾai/ /káɯ moN ~ káɯ | móN/	/kaɯ ɡɯ́ɾai/	/kaɯ dake/
Accented	Modern quinquegrade Classical quadrigrade/r‑irregular	yuu → yū (結う; 'ties hair')	/jɯ́ɯ → jɯ́R/	/jɯ́ɯ to → jɯ́R to/ /jɯ́ɯ zo → jɯ́R zo/	/jɯ́ɯ to → jɯ́R to/ /jɯ́ɯ dake → jɯ́R dake/ /jɯ́ɯ mono no → jɯ́R dake/	/jɯ́ɯ zo → jɯ́R zo/ /jɯ́ɯ mono → jɯ́R mono/	/jɯ́ɯ ɡɯɾai → jɯ́R ɡɯɾai ~ jɯ́ɯ | ɡɯ́ɾai → jɯ́R | ɡɯ́ɾai/ /jɯ́ɯ moN → jɯ́R moN ~ jɯ́ɯ | móN → jɯ́R | móN/	/jɯɯ ɡɯ́ɾai → jɯR ɡɯ́ɾai/	/jɯɯ dake → jɯR dake/
Accented	Modern quinquegrade Classical quadrigrade/r‑irregular	naru (成る; 'succeeds')	/náɾɯ/	/náɾɯ to/ /náɾɯ zo/	/náɾɯ to/ /náɾɯ dake/ /náɾɯ mono no/	/náɾɯ zo/ /náɾɯ mono/	/náɾɯ ɡɯɾai ~ náɾɯ | ɡɯ́ɾai/ /náɾɯ moN ~ náɾɯ | móN/	/naɾɯ ɡɯ́ɾai/	/naɾɯ dake/
Accented	Modern quinquegrade Classical quadrigrade/r‑irregular	aru (有る; 'exists')	/áɾɯ/	/áɾɯ to/ /áɾɯ zo/	/áɾɯ to/ /áɾɯ dake/ /áɾɯ mono no/	/áɾɯ zo/ /áɾɯ mono/	/áɾɯ ɡɯɾai ~ áɾɯ | ɡɯ́ɾai/ /áɾɯ moN ~ áɾɯ | móN/	/aɾɯ ɡɯ́ɾai/	/aɾɯ dake/
Accented	Modern quinquegrade Classical quadrigrade/r‑irregular	de aru → da (である→だ; 'is')	/de | áɾɯ → da/	/de | áɾɯ to → dá to/ /de | áɾɯ zo → dá zo/	/de | áɾɯ to → da to/ /de | áɾɯ dake/ /de | áɾɯ mono no → da mono no/	/de | áɾɯ zo → da zó/ /de | áɾɯ mono → da monó/	/de | áɾɯ ɡɯɾai ~ de | áɾɯ | ɡɯ́ɾai/ /de | áɾɯ moN ~ de | áɾɯ | móN → da móN/	/de | aɾɯ ɡɯ́ɾai/	/de | aɾɯ dake/
Accented	Modern quinquegrade Classical quadrigrade/r‑irregular	ta / da (た・だ)	/itáɾɯ → ita/ /joNdáɾɯ → joNda/	/itá to/ /joNdá to/ /itá zo/ /joNdá zo/	/ita to/ /joNda to/ /ita dake/ /joNda dake/ /ita mono no/ /joNda mono no/	/ita zó/ /joNda zó/ /ita monó/ /joNda monó/	/ita ɡɯ́ɾai/ /joNda ɡɯ́ɾai/ /ita móN/ /joNda móN/	/ita ɡɯ́ɾai/ /joNda ɡɯ́ɾai/	/ita dake/ /joNda dake/
Accented	Modern quinquegrade Classical quadrigrade/r‑irregular	ta / da (た・だ)	/ítaɾɯ → íta/ /jóNdaɾɯ → jóNda/	/íta to/ /jóNda to/ /íta zo/ /jóNda zo/	/íta to/ /jóNda to/ /íta dake/ /jóNda dake/ /íta mono no/ /jóNda mono no/	/íta zo/ /jóNda zo/ /íta mono/ /jóNda mono/	/íta ɡɯɾai ~ íta | ɡɯ́ɾai/ /jóNda ɡɯɾai ~ jóNda | ɡɯ́ɾai/ /íta moN ~ íta | móN/ /jóNda moN ~ jóNda | móN/	/ita ɡɯ́ɾai/ /joNda ɡɯ́ɾai/	/ita dake/ /joNda dake/
Accented	Modern quinquegrade Classical quadrigrade/r‑irregular	furu (降る; 'descends')	/ɸɯ́ɾɯ/	/ɸɯ́ɾɯ to/ /ɸɯ́ɾɯ zo/	/ɸɯ́ɾɯ to/ /ɸɯ́ɾɯ dake/ /ɸɯ́ɾɯ mono no/	/ɸɯ́ɾɯ zo/ /ɸɯ́ɾɯ mono/	/ɸɯ́ɾɯ ɡɯɾai ~ ɸɯ́ɾɯ | ɡɯ́ɾai/ /ɸɯ́ɾɯ moN ~ ɸɯ́ɾɯ | móN/	/ɸɯɾɯ ɡɯ́ɾai/	/ɸɯɾɯ dake/
Accented	Modern quinquegrade Classical quadrigrade/r‑irregular	utsuru (移る; 'is transferred')	/ɯtsɯ́ɾɯ/	/ɯtsɯ́ɾɯ to/ /ɯtsɯ́ɾɯ zo/	/ɯtsɯ́ɾɯ to/ /ɯtsɯ́ɾɯ dake/ /ɯtsɯ́ɾɯ mono no/	/ɯtsɯ́ɾɯ zo/ /ɯtsɯ́ɾɯ mono/	/ɯtsɯ́ɾɯ ɡɯɾai ~ ɯtsɯ́ɾɯ | ɡɯ́ɾai/ /ɯtsɯ́ɾɯ moN ~ ɯtsɯ́ɾɯ | móN/	/ɯtsɯɾɯ ɡɯ́ɾai/	/ɯtsɯɾɯ dake/
Accented	Modern quinquegrade Classical quadrigrade/r‑irregular	tsuku (付く; 'is stuck')	/tsɯ̥́kɯ → tsɯ̥kɯ́/	/tsɯ́kɯ̥ to → tsɯ̥kɯ́ to/ /tsɯ̥́kɯ zo → tsɯ̥kɯ́ zo/	/tsɯ́kɯ̥ to/ /tsɯ̥́kɯ dake → tsɯ̥kɯ́ dake/ /tsɯ̥́kɯ mono no → tsɯ̥kɯ́ mono no/	/tsɯ̥́kɯ zo → tsɯ̥kɯ́ zo/ /tsɯ̥́kɯ mono → tsɯ̥kɯ́ mono/	/tsɯ̥́kɯ ɡɯɾai → tsɯ̥kɯ́ ɡɯɾai ~ tsɯ̥́kɯ | ɡɯ́ɾai/ /tsɯ̥́kɯ moN → tsɯ̥kɯ́ moN ~ tsɯ̥́kɯ | móN/	/tsɯ̥kɯ ɡɯ́ɾai/	/tsɯ̥kɯ dake/
Accented	Modern quinquegrade Classical quadrigrade/r‑irregular	fusu (伏す; 'lies face-down')	/ɸɯ̥́sɯ → ɸɯ̥sɯ́/	/ɸɯ́sɯ̥ to → ɸɯ̥sɯ́ to/ /ɸɯ̥́sɯ zo → ɸɯ̥sɯ́ zo/	/ɸɯ́sɯ̥ to/ /ɸɯ̥́sɯ dake → ɸɯ̥sɯ́ dake/ /ɸɯ̥́sɯ mono no → ɸɯ̥sɯ́ mono no/	/ɸɯ̥́sɯ zo → ɸɯ̥sɯ́ zo/ /ɸɯ̥́sɯ mono → ɸɯ̥sɯ́ mono/	/ɸɯ̥́sɯ ɡɯɾai → ɸɯ̥sɯ́ ɡɯɾai ~ ɸɯ̥́sɯ | ɡɯ́ɾai/ /ɸɯ̥́sɯ moN → ɸɯ̥sɯ́ moN ~ ɸɯ̥́sɯ | móN/	/ɸɯ̥sɯ ɡɯ́ɾai/	/ɸɯ̥sɯ dake/
Accented	Modern quinquegrade Classical quadrigrade/r‑irregular	kakusu (隠す; 'conceals')	/kakɯ̥́sɯ → kakɯ̥sɯ́/	/kakɯ́sɯ̥ to → kakɯ̥sɯ́ to/ /kakɯ̥́sɯ zo → kakɯ̥sɯ́ zo/	/kakɯ́sɯ̥ to/ /kakɯ̥́sɯ dake → kakɯ̥sɯ́ dake/ /kakɯ̥́sɯ mono no → kakɯ̥sɯ́ mono no/	/kakɯ̥́sɯ zo → kakɯ̥sɯ́ zo/ /kakɯ̥́sɯ mono → kakɯ̥sɯ́ mono/	/kakɯ̥́sɯ ɡɯɾai → kakɯ̥sɯ́ ɡɯɾai ~ kakɯ̥́sɯ | ɡɯ́ɾai/ /kakɯ̥́sɯ moN → kakɯ̥sɯ́ moN ~ kakɯ̥́sɯ | móN/	/kakɯ̥sɯ ɡɯ́ɾai/	/kakɯ̥sɯ dake/
Accented	Modern quinquegrade Classical quadrigrade/r‑irregular	tōru (通る; 'goes through')	/tóRɾɯ/	/tóRɾɯ to/ /tóRɾɯ zo/	/tóRɾɯ to/ /tóRɾɯ dake/ /tóRɾɯ mono no/	/tóRɾɯ zo/ /tóRɾɯ mono/	/tóRɾɯ ɡɯɾai ~ tóRɾɯ | ɡɯ́ɾai/ /tóRɾɯ moN ~ tóRɾɯ | móN/	/toRɾɯ ɡɯ́ɾai/	/toRɾɯ dake/
Accented	Modern quinquegrade Classical quadrigrade/r‑irregular	kaeru (帰る; 'goes home')	/káeɾɯ/	/káeɾɯ to/ /káeɾɯ zo/	/káeɾɯ to/ /káeɾɯ dake/ /káeɾɯ mono no/	/káeɾɯ zo/ /káeɾɯ mono/	/káeɾɯ ɡɯɾai ~ káeɾɯ | ɡɯ́ɾai/ /káeɾɯ moN ~ káeɾɯ | móN/	/kaeɾɯ ɡɯ́ɾai/	/kaeɾɯ dake/
Accented	Modern unigrade Classical unigrade/bigrade	iru (射る; 'shoots')	/íɾɯ/	/íɾɯ to/ /íɾɯ zo/	/íɾɯ to/ /íɾɯ dake/ /íɾɯ mono no/	/íɾɯ zo/ /íɾɯ mono/	/íɾɯ ɡɯɾai ~ íɾɯ | ɡɯ́ɾai/ /íɾɯ moN ~ íɾɯ | móN/	/iɾɯ ɡɯ́ɾai/	/iɾɯ dake/
Accented	Modern unigrade Classical unigrade/bigrade	eru (得る; 'gets')	/éɾɯ/	/éɾɯ to/ /éɾɯ zo/	/éɾɯ to/ /éɾɯ dake/ /éɾɯ mono no/	/éɾɯ zo/ /éɾɯ mono/	/éɾɯ ɡɯɾai ~ éɾɯ | ɡɯ́ɾai/ /éɾɯ moN ~ éɾɯ | móN/	/eɾɯ ɡɯ́ɾai/	/eɾɯ dake/
Accented	Modern unigrade Classical unigrade/bigrade	hareru (晴れる; 'clears up')	/haɾéɾɯ/	/haɾéɾɯ to/ /haɾéɾɯ zo/	/haɾéɾɯ to/ /haɾéɾɯ dake/ /haɾéɾɯ mono no/	/haɾéɾɯ zo/ /haɾéɾɯ mono/	/haɾéɾɯ ɡɯɾai ~ haɾéɾɯ | ɡɯ́ɾai/ /haɾéɾɯ moN ~ haɾéɾɯ | móN/	/haɾeɾɯ ɡɯ́ɾai/	/haɾeɾɯ dake/
Accented	Modern unigrade Classical unigrade/bigrade	mochiiru (用いる; 'uses')	/mocɕiíɾɯ/	/mocɕiíɾɯ to/ /mocɕiíɾɯ zo/	/mocɕiíɾɯ to/ /mocɕiíɾɯ dake/ /mocɕiíɾɯ mono no/	/mocɕiíɾɯ zo/ /mocɕiíɾɯ mono/	/mocɕiíɾɯ ɡɯɾai ~ mocɕiíɾɯ | ɡɯ́ɾai/ /mocɕiíɾɯ moN ~ mocɕiíɾɯ | móN/	/mocɕiRɾɯ ɡɯ́ɾai/	/mocɕiRɾɯ dake/
Accented	Modern unigrade Classical unigrade/bigrade	kangaeru (考える; 'deliberates')	/kaNɡaéɾɯ → kaNɡáeɾɯ/	/kaNɡaéɾɯ to → kaNɡáeɾɯ to/ /kaNɡaéɾɯ zo → kaNɡáeɾɯ zo/	/kaNɡaéɾɯ to → kaNɡáeɾɯ to/ /kaNɡaéɾɯ dake → kaNɡáeɾɯ dake/ /kaNɡaéɾɯ mono no → kaNɡáeɾɯ mono no/	/kaNɡaéɾɯ zo → kaNɡáeɾɯ zo/ /kaNɡaéɾɯ mono → kaNɡáeɾɯ mono/	/kaNɡaéɾɯ ɡɯɾai → kaNɡáeɾɯ ɡɯɾai ~ kaNɡaéɾɯ | ɡɯ́ɾai → kaNɡáeɾɯ | ɡɯ́ɾai/ /kaNɡaéɾɯ moN → kaNɡáeɾɯ moN ~ kaNɡaéɾɯ | móN → kaNɡáeɾɯ | móN/	/kaNɡaeɾɯ ɡɯ́ɾai/	/kaNɡaeɾɯ dake/
Accented	Modern unigrade Classical unigrade/bigrade	mōkeru (設ける; 'establishes')	/moRkéɾɯ/	/moRkéɾɯ to/ /moRkéɾɯ zo/	/moRkéɾɯ to/ /moRkéɾɯ dake/ /moRkéɾɯ mono no/	/moRkéɾɯ zo/ /moRkéɾɯ mono/	/moRkéɾɯ ɡɯɾai ~ moRkéɾɯ | ɡɯ́ɾai/ /moRkéɾɯ moN ~ moRkéɾɯ | móN/	/moRkeɾɯ ɡɯ́ɾai/	/moRkeɾɯ dake/
Accented	Quinquegradified	nasa(re)ru (為さ(れ)る; 'does')	/nasáɾɯ, nasaɾéɾɯ/	/nasáɾɯ to, nasaɾéɾɯ to/ /nasáɾɯ zo, nasaɾéɾɯ zo/	/nasáɾɯ to, nasaɾéɾɯ to/ /nasáɾɯ dake, nasaɾéɾɯ dake/ /nasáɾɯ mono no, nasaɾéɾɯ mono no/	/nasáɾɯ zo, nasaɾéɾɯ zo/ /nasáɾɯ mono, nasaɾéɾɯ mono/	/nasáɾɯ ɡɯɾai ~ nasáɾɯ | ɡɯ́ɾai, nasaɾéɾɯ ɡɯɾai ~ nasaɾéɾɯ | ɡɯ́ɾai/ /nasáɾɯ moN ~ nasáɾɯ | móN, nasaɾéɾɯ moN ~ nasaɾéɾɯ | móN/	/nasa(ɾe)ɾɯ ɡɯ́ɾai/	/nasa(ɾe)ɾɯ dake/
Accented	S‑irregular	‑masu(ru) (ます(る))	/nasa(ɾ)imásɯ, nasa(ɾ)imasɯ́ɾɯ/	/nasa(ɾ)imásɯ̥ to, nasa(ɾ)imasɯ́ɾɯ to/ /nasa(ɾ)imásɯ zo, nasa(ɾ)imasɯ́ɾɯ zo/	/nasa(ɾ)imásɯ̥ to, nasa(ɾ)imasɯ́ɾɯ to/ /nasa(ɾ)imásɯ mono no, nasa(ɾ)imasɯ́ɾɯ mono no/	/nasa(ɾ)imásɯ zo, nasa(ɾ)imasɯ́ɾɯ zo/ /nasa(ɾ)imásɯ mono, nasa(ɾ)imasɯ́ɾɯ mono/	/nasa(ɾ)imásɯ moN ~ nasa(ɾ)imásɯ | móN, nasa(ɾ)imasɯ́ɾɯ moN ~ nasa(ɾ)imasɯ́ɾɯ | móN/		
Accented	S‑irregular	de arimasu(ru) → desu (であります(る)→です; 'is')	/de | aɾimásɯ → désɯ, de | aɾimasɯ́ɾɯ/	/de | aɾimásɯ̥ to → désɯ̥ to, de | aɾimasɯ́ɾɯ to/ /de | aɾimásɯ zo → désɯ zo, de | aɾimasɯ́ɾɯ zo/	/de | aɾimásɯ̥ to → désɯ̥ to, de | aɾimasɯ́ɾɯ to/ /de | aɾimásɯ mono no → désɯ mono no, de | aɾimasɯ́ɾɯ mono no/	/de | aɾimásɯ zo → désɯ zo, de | aɾimasɯ́ɾɯ zo/ /de | aɾimásɯ mono → désɯ mono, de | aɾimasɯ́ɾɯ mono/	/de | aɾimásɯ moN → désɯ moN ~ de | aɾimásɯ | móN → désɯ | móN, de | aɾimasɯ́ɾɯ moN ~ de | aɾimasɯ́ɾɯ | móN		
Accented	Quinquegradified	kasu(ru) (課す(る); 'assigns')	/kasɯ́ɾɯ, kásɯ/	/kasɯ́ɾɯ to, kásɯ̥ to/ /kasɯ́ɾɯ zo, kásɯ zo/	/kasɯ́ɾɯ to, kásɯ̥ to/ /kasɯ́ɾɯ dake, kásɯ dake/ /kasɯ́ɾɯ mono no, kásɯ mono no/	/kasɯ́ɾɯ zo, kásɯ zo/ /kasɯ́ɾɯ mono, kásɯ mono/	/kasɯ́ɾɯ ɡɯɾai ~ kasɯ́ɾɯ | ɡɯ́ɾai, kásɯ ɡɯɾai ~ kásɯ | ɡɯ́ɾai/ /kasɯ́ɾɯ moN ~ kasɯ́ɾɯ | móN, kásɯ moN ~ kásɯ | móN/	/kasɯ(ɾɯ) ɡɯ́ɾai/	/kasɯ(ɾɯ) dake/
Accented	Quinquegradified	aisu(ru) (愛す(る); 'loves')	/aisɯ́ɾɯ, áisɯ/	/aisɯ́ɾɯ to, áisɯ̥ to/ /aisɯ́ɾɯ zo, áisɯ zo/	/aisɯ́ɾɯ to, áisɯ̥ to/ /aisɯ́ɾɯ dake, áisɯ dake/ /aisɯ́ɾɯ mono no, áisɯ mono no/	/aisɯ́ɾɯ zo, áisɯ zo/ /aisɯ́ɾɯ mono, áisɯ mono/	/aisɯ́ɾɯ ɡɯɾai ~ aisɯ́ɾɯ | ɡɯ́ɾai, áisɯ ɡɯɾai ~ áisɯ | ɡɯ́ɾai/ /aisɯ́ɾɯ moN ~ aisɯ́ɾɯ | móN, áisɯ moN ~ áisɯ | móN/	/aisɯ(ɾɯ) ɡɯ́ɾai/	/aisɯ(ɾɯ) dake/
Accented	Unigradified	ronzuru, ronjiru (論ずる・論じる; 'discusses')	/ɾoNzɯ́ɾɯ, ɾoNʑíɾɯ/	/ɾoNzɯ́ɾɯ to, ɾoNʑíɾɯ to/ /ɾoNzɯ́ɾɯ zo, ɾoNʑíɾɯ zo/	/ɾoNzɯ́ɾɯ to, ɾoNʑíɾɯ to/ /ɾoNzɯ́ɾɯ dake, ɾoNʑíɾɯ dake/ /ɾoNzɯ́ɾɯ mono no, ɾoNʑíɾɯ mono no/	/ɾoNzɯ́ɾɯ zo, ɾoNʑíɾɯ zo/ /ɾoNzɯ́ɾɯ mono, ɾoNʑíɾɯ mono/	/ɾoNzɯ́ɾɯ ɡɯɾai ~ ɾoNzɯ́ɾɯ | ɡɯ́ɾai, ɾoNʑíɾɯ ɡɯɾai ~ ɾoNʑíɾɯ | ɡɯ́ɾai/ /ɾoNzɯ́ɾɯ moN ~ ɾoNzɯ́ɾɯ | móN, ɾoNʑíɾɯ moN ~ ɾoNʑíɾɯ | móN/	/ɾoNzɯɾɯ ɡɯ́ɾai, ɾoNʑiɾɯ ɡɯ́ɾai/	/ɾoNzɯɾɯ dake, ɾoNʑiɾɯ dake/
Accented	K‑irregular	kuru (来る; 'comes')	/kɯ́ɾɯ/	/kɯ́ɾɯ to/ /kɯ́ɾɯ zo/	/kɯ́ɾɯ to/ /kɯ́ɾɯ dake/ /kɯ́ɾɯ mono no/	/kɯ́ɾɯ zo/ /kɯ́ɾɯ mono/	/kɯ́ɾɯ ɡɯɾai ~ kɯ́ɾɯ | ɡɯ́ɾai/ /kɯ́ɾɯ moN ~ kɯ́ɾɯ | móN/	/kɯɾɯ ɡɯ́ɾai/	/kɯɾɯ dake/
Accented	Unigradified	dekiru (出来る; 'comes into existence')	/dekíɾɯ/	/dekíɾɯ to/ /dekíɾɯ zo/	/dekíɾɯ to/ /dekíɾɯ dake/ /dekíɾɯ mono no/	/dekíɾɯ zo/ /dekíɾɯ mono/	/dekíɾɯ ɡɯɾai ~ dekíɾɯ | ɡɯ́ɾai/ /dekíɾɯ moN ~ dekíɾɯ | móN/	/dekiɾɯ ɡɯ́ɾai/	/dekiɾɯ dake/

==== Verbal conclusive/attributive + auxiliary ====
Auxiliaries following conclusives or attributives can be classified into the following groups (asterisked auxiliaries belong to more than one group):

- Recessive and preaccenting (RecPre): no (da) / n da
- Recessive and preaccenting and penultimate-accented (RecPre−2):
  - Modern: darō*, deshō*, no desu / n desu
  - Classical: nari
- Recessive and initial-accented (Rec+1): sō (da), yō (da), mitai (da)
- Recessive and penultimate-accented (Rec−2):
  - Modern: darō*, deshō*, rashī*
  - Classical: beshi*, rashi*, maji*, ran* / ramu*
- Recessive and antepenultimate-accented (Rec−3):
- Dominant and penultimate-accented:
  - Modern: mai, rashī*
  - Classical: beshi*, rashi*, maji*, ran* / ramu*
- Dominant or type-preserving, and unaccented or initial-accented: mai to
- Recessive or dominant, antepenultimate-accented, classical: gotoshi

Verb type			Modern conclusive/attributive	RecPre	RecPre−2	Rec+1	Rec−2	Dom−2	mai to	gotoshi
Unaccented	Modern quinquegrade Classical quadrigrade/n‑irregular	kau (買う; 'buys')	/kaɯ/	/kaɯ́ no/	/kaɯ́ deɕoR ~ kaɯ́ | deɕóR/ /kóR naɾi ~ kóR | náɾi/	/kaɯ jóR/	/kaɯ deɕóR/ /kaɯ ɾaɕíR, koR ɾáɕi̥/	/kaɯ ɾaɕíR, koR ɾáɕi̥/ /kaɯ mái/	/kaɯ mái to ~ kaɯ mai to/	/koR ɡótoɕi̥/
Unaccented	Modern quinquegrade Classical quadrigrade/n‑irregular	yuu → yū (結う; 'ties hair')	/jɯɯ → jɯR/	/jɯɯ́ no/	/jɯɯ́ deɕoR ~ jɯɯ́ | deɕóR/ /jɯ́R naɾi ~ jɯ́R | náɾi/	/jɯɯ jóR → jɯR jóR/	/jɯɯ deɕóR → jɯR deɕóR/ /jɯɯ ɾaɕíR → jɯR ɾaɕíR, jɯR ɾáɕi̥/	/jɯɯ ɾaɕíR → jɯR ɾaɕíR, jɯR ɾáɕi̥/ /jɯɯ mái → jɯR mái/	/jɯɯ mái to → jɯR mái to ~ jɯɯ mai to → jɯR mai to/	/jɯR ɡótoɕi̥/
Unaccented	Modern quinquegrade Classical quadrigrade/n‑irregular	yū (言う; 'says')	/jɯR/	/jɯ́R no/	/jɯ́R deɕoR ~ jɯ́R | deɕóR/ /jɯ́R naɾi ~ jɯ́R | náɾi/	/jɯR jóR/	/jɯR deɕóR/ /jɯR ɾaɕíR, jɯR ɾáɕi̥/ /jɯR mái/	/jɯR mái to ~ jɯR mai to/	/jɯR ɾaɕíR, jɯR ɾáɕi̥/	/jɯR ɡótoɕi̥/
Unaccented	Modern quinquegrade Classical quadrigrade/n‑irregular	yuku → iku (行く; 'goes')	/jɯkɯ → ikɯ/	/jɯkɯ́ no → ikɯ́ no/	/jɯkɯ́ deɕoR → ikɯ́ deɕoR ~ jɯkɯ́ | deɕóR → ikɯ́ | deɕóR/ /jɯkɯ́ naɾi/	/jɯkɯ jóR → ikɯ jóR/	/jɯkɯ deɕóR → ikɯ deɕóR/ /jɯkɯ ɾaɕíR → ikɯ ɾaɕíR, jɯkɯ ɾáɕi̥/	/jɯkɯ ɾaɕíR → ikɯ ɾaɕíR, jɯkɯ ɾáɕi̥/ /jɯkɯ mái → ikɯ mái/	/jɯkɯ mái to → ikɯ mái to ~ jɯkɯ mai to → ikɯ mai to/	/jɯkɯ ɡótoɕi̥/
Unaccented	Modern quinquegrade Classical quadrigrade/n‑irregular	naru (鳴る; 'makes a sound')	/naɾɯ/	/naɾɯ́ no/	/naɾɯ́ deɕoR ~ naɾɯ́ | deɕóR/ /naɾɯ́ naɾi/	/naɾɯ jóR/	/naɾɯ deɕóR/ /naɾɯ ɾaɕíR, naɾɯ ɾáɕi̥/	/naɾɯ ɾaɕíR, naɾɯ ɾáɕi̥/ /naɾɯ mái/	/naɾɯ mái to ~ naɾɯ mai to/	/naɾɯ ɡótoɕi̥/
Unaccented	Modern quinquegrade Classical quadrigrade/n‑irregular	furu (振る; 'shakes')	/ɸɯɾɯ/	/ɸɯɾɯ́ no/	/ɸɯɾɯ́ deɕoR ~ ɸɯɾɯ́ | deɕóR/ /ɸɯɾɯ́ naɾi/	/ɸɯɾɯ jóR/	/ɸɯɾɯ deɕóR/ /ɸɯɾɯ ɾaɕíR, ɸɯɾɯ ɾáɕi̥/	/ɸɯɾɯ ɾaɕíR, ɸɯɾɯ ɾáɕi̥/ /ɸɯɾɯ mái/	/ɸɯɾɯ mái to ~ ɸɯɾɯ mai to/	/ɸɯɾɯ ɡótoɕi̥/
Unaccented	Modern quinquegrade Classical quadrigrade/n‑irregular	shinu (死ぬ; 'dies')	/ɕinɯ/	/ɕinɯ́ no/	/ɕinɯ́ deɕoR ~ ɕinɯ́ | deɕóR/ /ɕinɯ́ naɾi/	/ɕinɯ jóR/	/ɕinɯ deɕóR/ /ɕinɯ ɾaɕíR, ɕinɯ ɾáɕi̥/	/ɕinɯ ɾaɕíR, ɕinɯ ɾáɕi̥/ /ɕinɯ mái/	/ɕinɯ mái to ~ ɕinɯ mai to/	/ɕinɯ ɡótoɕi̥/
Unaccented	Modern unigrade Classical unigrade/bigrade	iru (居る; 'exists')	/iɾɯ/	/iɾɯ́ no/	/iɾɯ́ deɕoR ~ iɾɯ́ | deɕóR/ /iɾɯ́ naɾi/	/iɾɯ jóR/	/iɾɯ deɕóR/ /iɾɯ ɾaɕíR, iɾɯ ɾáɕi̥/	/iɾɯ ɾaɕíR, iɾɯ ɾáɕi̥/ /iɾɯ mái/	/iɾɯ mái to ~ iɾɯ mai to/	/iɾɯ ɡótoɕi̥/
Unaccented	Modern unigrade Classical unigrade/bigrade	hareru (腫れる; 'swells')	/haɾeɾɯ/	/haɾeɾɯ́ no/	/haɾeɾɯ́ deɕoR ~ haɾeɾɯ́ | deɕóR/ /haɾɯ́ naɾi/	/haɾeɾɯ jóR/	/haɾeɾɯ deɕóR/ /haɾeɾɯ ɾaɕíR, haɾɯ ɾáɕi̥/	/haɾeɾɯ ɾaɕíR, haɾɯ ɾáɕi̥/ /haɾeɾɯ mái/	/haɾeɾɯ mái to ~ haɾeɾɯ mai to/	/haɾɯ ɡótoɕi̥/
Unaccented	Modern unigrade Classical unigrade/bigrade	mochīru (用いる; 'uses')	/mocɕiRɾɯ/	/mocɕiRɾɯ́ no/	/mocɕiRɾɯ́ deɕoR ~ mocɕiRɾɯ́ | deɕóR/ /mocɕiRɾɯ́ naɾi/	/mocɕiRɾɯ jóR/	/mocɕiRɾɯ deɕóR/ /mocɕiRɾɯ ɾaɕíR, mocɕiRɾɯ ɾáɕi̥/	/mocɕiRɾɯ ɾaɕíR, mocɕiRɾɯ ɾáɕi̥/ /mocɕiRɾɯ mái/	/mocɕiRɾɯ mái to ~ mocɕiRɾɯ mai to/	/mocɕiRɾɯ ɡótoɕi̥/
Unaccented	S‑irregular	suru (する; 'does')	/sɯɾɯ/	/sɯɾɯ́ no/	/sɯɾɯ́ deɕoR ~ sɯɾɯ́ | deɕóR/ /sɯ́ naɾi/	/sɯɾɯ jóR/	/sɯɾɯ deɕóR/ /sɯɾɯ ɾaɕíR, sɯ ɾáɕi̥/	/sɯɾɯ ɾaɕíR, sɯ ɾáɕi̥/ /sɯɾɯ mái/	/sɯɾɯ mái to ~ sɯɾɯ mai to/	/sɯ ɡótoɕi̥/
Unaccented	Quinquegradified	tassu(ru) (達す(る); 'reaches')	/taQsɯ(ɾɯ)/	/taQsɯɾɯ́ no, taQsɯ́ no/	/taQsɯɾɯ́ deɕoR ~ taQsɯɾɯ́ | deɕóR, taQsɯ́ deɕoR ~ taQsɯ́ | deɕóR/ /taQsɯ́ naɾi/	/taQsɯɾ(ɾɯ) jóR/	/taQsɯɾ(ɾɯ) deɕóR/ /taQsɯ(ɾɯ) ɾaɕíR, taQsɯ ɾáɕi̥/	/taQsɯ(ɾɯ) ɾaɕíR, taQsɯ ɾáɕi̥/ /taQsɯ(ɾɯ) mái/	/taQsɯ(ɾɯ) mái to ~ taQsɯ(ɾɯ) mai to/	/taQsɯ ɡótoɕi̥/
Unaccented	Unigradified	ronzuru, ronjiru (論ずる・論じる; 'discusses')	/ɾoNzɯɾɯ, ɾoNʑiɾɯ/	/ɾoNzɯɾɯ́ no, ɾoNʑiɾɯ́ no/	/ɾoNzɯɾɯ́ deɕoR ~ ɾoNzɯɾɯ́ | deɕóR, ɾoNʑiɾɯ́ deɕoR ~ ɾoNʑiɾɯ́ | deɕóR/ /ɾoNzɯ́ naɾi/	/ɾoNzɯɾɯ jóR, ɾoNʑiɾɯ jóR/	/ɾoNzɯɾɯ deɕóR, ɾoNʑiɾɯ deɕóR/ /ɾoNzɯɾɯ ɾaɕíR, ɾoNʑiɾɯ ɾaɕíR, ɾoNzɯ ɾáɕi̥/	/ɾoNzɯɾɯ ɾaɕíR, ɾoNʑiɾɯ ɾaɕíR, ɾoNzɯ ɾáɕi̥/ /ɾoNzɯɾɯ mái, ɾoNʑiɾɯ mái/	/ɾoNzɯɾɯ mái to ~ ɾoNzɯɾɯ mai to, ɾoNʑiɾɯ mái to ~ ɾoNʑiɾɯ mai to/	/ɾoNzɯ ɡótoɕi̥/
Accented	Modern quinquegrade Classical quadrigrade/r‑irregular	kau (飼う; 'rears')	/káɯ/	/káɯ no/	/káɯ deɕoR ~ káɯ | deɕóR/ /kóR naɾi ~ kóR | náɾi/	/káɯ joR ~ káɯ | jóR/	/káɯ deɕoR ~ káɯ | deɕóR/ /káɯ ɾaɕiR ~ káɯ | ɾaɕíR, kóR ɾaɕi̥ ~ kóR | ɾáɕi̥/	/kaɯ ɾaɕíR, koR ɾáɕi̥/ /kaɯ mái/	/kaɯ mái to/	/kóR ɡotoɕi̥ ~ kóR | ɡótoɕi̥ ~ koR ɡótoɕi̥/
Accented	Modern quinquegrade Classical quadrigrade/r‑irregular	yuu → yū (結う; 'ties hair')	/jɯ́ɯ → jɯ́R/	/jɯ́ɯ no → jɯ́R no/	/jɯ́ɯ deɕoR → jɯ́R deɕoR ~ jɯ́ɯ | deɕóR → jɯ́R | deɕóR/ /jɯ́R naɾi ~ jɯ́R | náɾi/	/jɯ́ɯ joR → jɯ́R joR ~ jɯ́ɯ | jóR → jɯ́R | jóR/	/jɯ́ɯ deɕoR → jɯ́R deɕoR ~ jɯ́ɯ | deɕóR → jɯ́R | deɕóR/ /jɯ́ɯ ɾaɕiR → jɯ́R ɾaɕiR ~ jɯ́ɯ | ɾaɕíR → jɯ́R | ɾaɕíR, jɯ́R ɾaɕi̥ ~ jɯ́R | ɾáɕi̥/	/jɯɯ ɾaɕíR → jɯR ɾaɕíR, jɯR ɾáɕi̥/ /jɯɯ mái → jɯR mái/	/jɯɯ mái to → jɯR mái to/	/jɯ́R ɡotoɕi̥ ~ jɯ́R | ɡótoɕi̥ ~ jɯR ɡótoɕi̥/
Accented	Modern quinquegrade Classical quadrigrade/r‑irregular	naru (成る; 'succeeds')	/náɾɯ/	/náɾɯ no/	/náɾɯ deɕoR ~ náɾɯ | deɕóR/ /náɾɯ naɾi ~ náɾɯ | náɾi/	/náɾɯ joR ~ náɾɯ | jóR/	/náɾɯ deɕoR ~ náɾɯ | deɕóR/ /náɾɯ ɾaɕiR ~ náɾɯ | ɾaɕíR, náɾɯ ɾaɕi̥ ~ náɾɯ | ɾáɕi̥/	/naɾɯ ɾaɕíR, naɾɯ ɾáɕi̥/ /naɾɯ mái/	/naɾɯ mái to/	/náɾɯ ɡotoɕi̥ ~ náɾɯ | ɡótoɕi̥ ~ naɾɯ ɡótoɕi̥/
Accented	Modern quinquegrade Classical quadrigrade/r‑irregular	aru (有る; 'exists')	/áɾɯ/	/áɾɯ no/	/áɾɯ deɕoR ~ áɾɯ | deɕóR/ /áɾɯ naɾi ~ áɾɯ | náɾi/	/áɾɯ joR ~ áɾɯ | jóR/	/áɾɯ deɕoR ~ áɾɯ | deɕóR/ /áɾɯ ɾaɕiR ~ áɾɯ | ɾaɕíR, áɾɯ ɾaɕi̥ ~ áɾɯ | ɾáɕi̥/	/aɾɯ ɾaɕíR, aɾɯ ɾáɕi̥/ /aɾɯ mái/	/aɾɯ mái to/	/áɾɯ ɡotoɕi̥ ~ áɾɯ | ɡótoɕi̥ ~ aɾɯ ɡótoɕi̥/
Accented	Modern quinquegrade Classical quadrigrade/r‑irregular	de aru → da (である→だ; 'is')	/de | áɾɯ → da/	/de | áɾɯ no → dá no/ /ná(ɾɯ) no/	/de | áɾɯ deɕoR ~ de | áɾɯ | deɕóR/	/de | áɾɯ joR ~ de | áɾɯ | jóR/ /náɾɯ joR → na jóR ~ náɾɯ | jóR/	/de | áɾɯ deɕoR ~ de | áɾɯ | deɕóR/ /de | áɾɯ ɾaɕiR ~ de | áɾɯ | ɾaɕíR/	/de | aɾɯ ɾaɕíR/ /de | aɾɯ mái/	/de | aɾɯ mái to/	
Accented	Modern quinquegrade Classical quadrigrade/r‑irregular	‑ta / ‑da (た・だ)	/itáɾɯ → ita/ /joNdáɾɯ → joNda/	/itá no/ /joNdá no/	/itá deɕoR ~ itá | deɕóR/ /joNdá deɕoR ~ joNdá | deɕóR/	/ita jóR/ /joNda jóR/	/ita deɕóR/ /joNda deɕóR/ /ita ɾaɕíR/ /joNda ɾaɕíR/	/ita ɾaɕíR/ /joNda ɾaɕíR/		
Accented	Modern quinquegrade Classical quadrigrade/r‑irregular	‑ta / ‑da (た・だ)	/ítaɾɯ → íta/ /jóNdaɾɯ → jóNda/	/íta no/ /jóNda no/	/íta deɕoR ~ íta | deɕóR/ /jóNda deɕoR ~ jóNda | deɕóR/	/íta joR ~ íta | jóR/ /jóNda joR ~ jóNda | jóR/	/íta deɕoR ~ íta | deɕóR/ /jóNda deɕoR ~ jóNda | deɕóR/ /íta ɾaɕiR ~ íta | ɾaɕíR/ /jóNda ɾaɕiR ~ jóNda | ɾaɕíR/	/ita ɾaɕíR/ /joNda ɾaɕíR/		
Accented	Modern quinquegrade Classical quadrigrade/r‑irregular	furu (降る; 'descends')	/ɸɯ́ɾɯ/	/ɸɯ́ɾɯ no/	/ɸɯ́ɾɯ deɕoR ~ ɸɯ́ɾɯ | deɕóR/ /ɸɯ́ɾɯ naɾi ~ ɸɯ́ɾɯ | náɾi/	/ɸɯ́ɾɯ joR ~ ɸɯ́ɾɯ | jóR/	/ɸɯ́ɾɯ deɕoR ~ ɸɯ́ɾɯ | deɕóR/ /ɸɯ́ɾɯ ɾaɕiR ~ ɸɯ́ɾɯ | ɾaɕíR, ɸɯ́ɾɯ ɾaɕi̥ ~ ɸɯ́ɾɯ | ɾáɕi̥/	/ɸɯɾɯ ɾaɕíR, ɸɯɾɯ ɾáɕi̥/ /ɸɯɾɯ mái/	/ɸɯɾɯ mái to/	/ɸɯ́ɾɯ ɡotoɕi̥ ~ ɸɯ́ɾɯ | ɡótoɕi̥ ~ ɸɯɾɯ ɡótoɕi̥/
Accented	Modern quinquegrade Classical quadrigrade/r‑irregular	utsuru (移る; 'is transferred')	/ɯtsɯ́ɾɯ/	/ɯtsɯ́ɾɯ no/	/ɯtsɯ́ɾɯ deɕoR ~ ɯtsɯ́ɾɯ | deɕóR/ /ɯtsɯ́ɾɯ naɾi ~ ɯtsɯ́ɾɯ | náɾi/	/ɯtsɯ́ɾɯ joR ~ ɯtsɯ́ɾɯ | jóR/	/ɯtsɯ́ɾɯ deɕoR ~ ɯtsɯ́ɾɯ | deɕóR/ /ɯtsɯ́ɾɯ ɾaɕiR ~ ɯtsɯ́ɾɯ | ɾaɕíR, ɯtsɯ́ɾɯ ɾaɕi̥ ~ ɯtsɯ́ɾɯ | ɾáɕi̥/	/ɯtsɯɾɯ ɾaɕíR, ɯtsɯɾɯ ɾáɕi̥/ /ɯtsɯɾɯ mái/	/ɯtsɯɾɯ mái to/	/ɯtsɯ́ɾɯ ɡotoɕi̥ ~ ɯtsɯ́ɾɯ | ɡótoɕi̥ ~ ɯtsɯɾɯ ɡótoɕi̥/
Accented	Modern quinquegrade Classical quadrigrade/r‑irregular	tsuku (付く; 'is stuck')	/tsɯ̥́kɯ → tsɯ̥kɯ́/	/tsɯ̥́kɯ no → tsɯ̥kɯ́ no/	/tsɯ̥́kɯ deɕoR → tsɯ̥kɯ́ deɕoR ~ tsɯ̥́kɯ | deɕóR → tsɯ̥kɯ́ | deɕóR/ /tsɯ̥́kɯ naɾi → tsɯ̥kɯ́ naɾi ~ tsɯ̥́kɯ | náɾi/	/tsɯ̥́kɯ joR → tsɯ̥kɯ́ joR ~ tsɯ̥́kɯ | jóR/	/tsɯ̥́kɯ deɕoR → tsɯ̥kɯ́ deɕoR ~ tsɯ̥́kɯ | deɕóR → tsɯ̥kɯ́ | deɕóR/ /tsɯ̥́kɯ ɾaɕiR → tsɯ̥kɯ́ ɾaɕiR ~ tsɯ̥́kɯ | ɾaɕíR → tsɯ̥kɯ́ | ɾaɕíR, tsɯ̥́kɯ ɾaɕi̥ → tsɯ̥kɯ́ ɾaɕi̥ ~ tsɯ̥́kɯ | ɾáɕi̥/	/tsɯ̥kɯ ɾaɕíR, tsɯ̥kɯ ɾáɕi̥/ /tsɯ̥kɯ mái/	/tsɯ̥kɯ mái to/	/tsɯ̥́kɯ ɡotoɕi̥ → tsɯ̥kɯ́ ɡotoɕi̥ ~ tsɯ̥́kɯ | ɡótoɕi̥ ~ tsɯ̥kɯ ɡótoɕi̥/
Accented	Modern quinquegrade Classical quadrigrade/r‑irregular	fusu (伏す; 'lies face-down')	/ɸɯ̥́sɯ → ɸɯ̥sɯ́/	/ɸɯ̥́sɯ no → ɸɯ̥sɯ́ no/	/ɸɯ̥́sɯ deɕoR → ɸɯ̥sɯ́ deɕoR ~ ɸɯ̥́sɯ | deɕóR → ɸɯ̥sɯ́ | deɕóR/ /ɸɯ̥́sɯ naɾi → ɸɯ̥sɯ́ naɾi ~ ɸɯ̥́sɯ | náɾi/	/ɸɯ̥́sɯ joR → ɸɯ̥sɯ́ joR ~ ɸɯ̥́sɯ | jóR/	/ɸɯ̥́sɯ deɕoR → ɸɯ̥sɯ́ deɕoR ~ ɸɯ̥́sɯ | deɕóR → ɸɯ̥sɯ́ | deɕóR/ /ɸɯ̥́sɯ ɾaɕiR → ɸɯ̥sɯ́ ɾaɕiR ~ ɸɯ̥́sɯ | ɾaɕíR → ɸɯ̥sɯ́ | ɾaɕíR, ɸɯ̥́sɯ ɾaɕi̥ → ɸɯ̥sɯ́ ɾaɕi̥ ~ ɸɯ̥́sɯ | ɾáɕi̥/	/ɸɯ̥sɯ ɾaɕíR, ɸɯ̥sɯ ɾáɕi̥/ /ɸɯ̥sɯ mái/	/ɸɯ̥sɯ mái to/	/ɸɯ̥́sɯ ɡotoɕi̥ → ɸɯ̥sɯ́ ɡotoɕi̥ ~ ɸɯ̥́sɯ | ɡótoɕi̥ ~ ɸɯ̥sɯ ɡótoɕi̥/
Accented	Modern quinquegrade Classical quadrigrade/r‑irregular	kakusu (隠す; 'conceals')	/kakɯ̥́sɯ → kakɯ̥sɯ́/	/kakɯ̥́sɯ no → kakɯ̥sɯ́ no/	/kakɯ̥́sɯ deɕoR → kakɯ̥sɯ́ deɕoR ~ kakɯ̥́sɯ | deɕóR → kakɯ̥sɯ́ | deɕóR/ /kakɯ̥́sɯ naɾi → kakɯ̥sɯ́ naɾi ~ kakɯ̥́sɯ | náɾi/	/kakɯ̥́sɯ joR → kakɯ̥sɯ́ joR ~ kakɯ̥́sɯ | jóR/	/kakɯ̥́sɯ deɕoR → kakɯ̥sɯ́ deɕoR ~ kakɯ̥́sɯ | deɕóR → kakɯ̥sɯ́ | deɕóR/ /kakɯ̥́sɯ ɾaɕiR → kakɯ̥sɯ́ ɾaɕiR ~ kakɯ̥́sɯ | ɾaɕíR → kakɯ̥sɯ́ | ɾaɕíR, kakɯ̥́sɯ ɾaɕi̥ → kakɯ̥sɯ́ ɾaɕi̥ ~ kakɯ̥́sɯ | ɾáɕi̥/	/kakɯ̥sɯ ɾaɕíR, kakɯ̥sɯ ɾáɕi̥/ /kakɯ̥sɯ mái/	/kakɯ̥sɯ mái to/	/kakɯ̥́sɯ ɡotoɕi̥ → kakɯ̥sɯ́ ɡotoɕi̥ ~ kakɯ̥́sɯ | ɡótoɕi̥ ~ kakɯ̥sɯ ɡótoɕi̥/
Accented	Modern quinquegrade Classical quadrigrade/r‑irregular	tōru (通る; 'goes through')	/tóRɾɯ/	/tóRɾɯ no/	/tóRɾɯ deɕoR ~ tóRɾɯ | deɕóR/ /tóRɾɯ naɾi ~ tóRɾɯ | náɾi/	/tóRɾɯ joR ~ tóRɾɯ | jóR/	/tóRɾɯ deɕoR ~ tóRɾɯ | deɕóR/ /tóRɾɯ ɾaɕiR ~ tóRɾɯ | ɾaɕíR, tóRɾɯ ɾaɕi̥ ~ tóRɾɯ | ɾáɕi̥/	/toRɾɯ ɾaɕíR, toRɾɯ ɾáɕi̥/ /toRɾɯ mái/	/toRɾɯ mái to/	/tóRɾɯ ɡotoɕi̥ ~ tóRɾɯ | ɡótoɕi̥ ~ toRɾɯ ɡótoɕi̥/
Accented	Modern quinquegrade Classical quadrigrade/r‑irregular	kaeru (帰る; 'goes home')	/káeɾɯ/	/káeɾɯ no/	/káeɾɯ deɕoR ~ káeɾɯ | deɕóR/ /káeɾɯ naɾi ~ káeɾɯ | náɾi/	/káeɾɯ joR ~ káeɾɯ | jóR/	/káeɾɯ deɕoR ~ káeɾɯ | deɕóR/ /káeɾɯ ɾaɕiR ~ káeɾɯ | ɾaɕíR, káeɾɯ ɾaɕi̥ ~ káeɾɯ | ɾáɕi̥/	/kaeɾɯ ɾaɕíR, kaeɾɯ ɾáɕi̥/ /kaeɾɯ mái/	/kaeɾɯ mái to/	/káeɾɯ ɡotoɕi̥ ~ káeɾɯ | ɡótoɕi̥ ~ kaeɾɯ ɡótoɕi̥/
Accented	Modern unigrade Classical unigrade/bigrade	iru (射る; 'shoots')	/íɾɯ/	/íɾɯ no/	/íɾɯ deɕoR ~ íɾɯ | deɕóR/ /íɾɯ naɾi ~ íɾɯ | náɾi/	/íɾɯ joR ~ íɾɯ | jóR/	/íɾɯ deɕoR ~ íɾɯ | deɕóR/ /íɾɯ ɾaɕiR ~ íɾɯ | ɾaɕíR, íɾɯ ɾaɕi̥ ~ íɾɯ | ɾáɕi̥/	/iɾɯ ɾaɕíR, iɾɯ ɾáɕi̥/ /iɾɯ mái/	/iɾɯ mái to/	/íɾɯ ɡotoɕi̥ ~ íɾɯ | ɡótoɕi̥ ~ iɾɯ ɡótoɕi̥/
Accented	Modern unigrade Classical unigrade/bigrade	eru (得る; 'gets')	/éɾɯ/	/éɾɯ no/	/éɾɯ deɕoR ~ éɾɯ | deɕóR/ /ɯ́ naɾi/	/éɾɯ joR ~ éɾɯ | jóR/	/éɾɯ deɕoR ~ éɾɯ | deɕóR/ /éɾɯ ɾaɕiR ~ éɾɯ | ɾaɕíR, ɯ́ ɾaɕi̥/	/eɾɯ ɾaɕíR, ɯ ɾáɕi̥/ /eɾɯ mái/	/eɾɯ mái to/	/ɯ́ ɡotoɕi̥ ~ ɯ ɡótoɕi̥/
Accented	Modern unigrade Classical unigrade/bigrade	hareru (晴れる; 'clears up')	/haɾéɾɯ/	/haɾéɾɯ no/	/haɾéɾɯ deɕoR ~ haɾéɾɯ | deɕóR/ /háɾɯ naɾi ~ háɾɯ | náɾi/	/haɾéɾɯ joR ~ haɾéɾɯ | jóR/	/haɾéɾɯ deɕoR ~ haɾéɾɯ | deɕóR/ /haɾéɾɯ ɾaɕiR ~ haɾéɾɯ | ɾaɕíR, háɾɯ ɾaɕi̥ ~ háɾɯ | ɾáɕi̥/	/haɾeɾɯ ɾaɕíR, haɾɯ ɾáɕi̥/ /haɾeɾɯ mái/	/haɾeɾɯ mái to/	/háɾɯ ɡotoɕi̥ ~ háɾɯ | ɡótoɕi̥ ~ haɾɯ ɡótoɕi̥/
Accented	Modern unigrade Classical unigrade/bigrade	mochiiru (用いる; 'uses')	/mocɕiíɾɯ/	/mocɕiíɾɯ no/	/mocɕiíɾɯ deɕoR ~ mocɕiíɾɯ | deɕóR/ /mocɕiíɾɯ naɾi ~ mocɕiíɾɯ | náɾi	/mocɕiíɾɯ joR ~ mocɕiíɾɯ | jóR/	/mocɕiíɾɯ deɕoR ~ mocɕiíɾɯ | deɕóR/ /mocɕiíɾɯ ɾaɕiR ~ mocɕiíɾɯ | ɾaɕíR, mocɕiíɾɯ ɾaɕi̥ ~ mocɕiíɾɯ | ɾáɕi̥/	/mocɕiRɾɯ ɾaɕíR, mocɕiRɾɯ ɾáɕi̥/ /mocɕiRɾɯ mái/	/mocɕiRɾɯ mái to/	/mocɕiíɾɯ ɡotoɕi̥ ~ mocɕiíɾɯ | ɡótoɕi̥ ~ mocɕiRɾɯ ɡótoɕi̥/
Accented	Modern unigrade Classical unigrade/bigrade	kangaeru (考える; 'deliberates')	/kaNɡaéɾɯ → kaNɡáeɾɯ/	/kaNɡaéɾɯ no → kaNɡáeɾɯ no/	/kaNɡaéɾɯ deɕoR → kaNɡáeɾɯ deɕoR ~ kaNɡaéɾɯ | deɕóR → kaNɡáeɾɯ | deɕóR/ /kaNɡóR naɾi ~ kaNɡóR | náɾi/	/kaNɡaéɾɯ joR → kaNɡáeɾɯ joR ~ kaNɡaéɾɯ | jóR → kaNɡáeɾɯ | jóR/	/kaNɡaéɾɯ deɕoR → kaNɡáeɾɯ deɕoR ~ kaNɡaéɾɯ | deɕóR → kaNɡáeɾɯ | deɕóR/ /kaNɡaéɾɯ ɾaɕiR → kaNɡáeɾɯ ɾaɕiR ~ kaNɡaéɾɯ | ɾaɕíR → kaNɡáeɾɯ | ɾaɕíR, kaNɡóR ɾaɕi̥ ~ kaNɡóR | ɾáɕi̥/	/kaNɡaeɾɯ ɾaɕíR, kaNɡoR ɾáɕi̥/ /kaNɡaeɾɯ mái/	/kaNɡaeɾɯ mái to/	/kaNɡóR ɡotoɕi̥ ~ kaNɡóR | ɡótoɕi̥ ~ kaNɡoR ɡótoɕi̥/
Accented	Modern unigrade Classical unigrade/bigrade	mōkeru (設ける; 'establishes')	/moRkéɾɯ/	/moRkéɾɯ no/	/moRkéɾɯ deɕoR ~ moRkéɾɯ | deɕóR/ /móRkɯ naɾi ~ móRkɯ | náɾi/	/moRkéɾɯ joR ~ moRkéɾɯ | jóR/	/moRkéɾɯ deɕoR ~ moRkéɾɯ | deɕóR/ /moRkéɾɯ ɾaɕiR ~ moRkéɾɯ | ɾaɕíR, móRkɯ ɾaɕi̥ ~ móRkɯ | ɾáɕi̥/	/moRkeɾɯ ɾaɕíR, moRkɯ ɾáɕi̥/ /moRkeɾɯ mái/	/moRkeɾɯ mái to/	/móRkɯ ɡotoɕi̥ ~ móRkɯ | ɡótoɕi̥ ~ moRkɯ ɡótoɕi̥/
Accented	Quinquegradified	nasa(re)ru (為さ(れ)る; 'does')	/nasáɾɯ, nasaɾéɾɯ/	/nasáɾɯ no, nasaɾéɾɯ no/	/nasáɾɯ deɕoR ~ nasáɾɯ | deɕóR, nasaɾéɾɯ deɕoR ~ nasaɾéɾɯ | deɕóR/ /nasáɾɯ naɾi ~ nasáɾɯ | náɾi/	/nasáɾɯ joR ~ nasáɾɯ | jóR, nasaɾéɾɯ joR ~ nasaɾéɾɯ | jóR/	/nasáɾɯ deɕoR ~ nasáɾɯ | deɕóR, nasaɾéɾɯ deɕoR ~ nasaɾéɾɯ | deɕóR/ /nasáɾɯ ɾaɕiR ~ nasáɾɯ | ɾaɕíR, nasaɾéɾɯ ɾaɕiR ~ nasaɾéɾɯ | ɾaɕíR, nasáɾɯ ɾaɕi̥ ~ nasáɾɯ | ɾáɕi̥/	/nasa(ɾe)ɾɯ ɾaɕíR, nasaɾɯ ɾáɕi̥/ /nasa(ɾe)ɾɯ mái/	/nasa(ɾe)ɾɯ mái to/	/nasáɾɯ ɡotoɕi̥ ~ nasáɾɯ | ɡótoɕi̥ ~ nasaɾɯ ɡótoɕi̥/
Accented	S‑irregular	‑masu(ru) (ます(る))	/nasa(ɾ)imásɯ, nasa(ɾ)imasɯ́ɾɯ/	/nasa(ɾ)imásɯ no, nasa(ɾ)imasɯ́ɾɯ no/	/nasa(ɾ)imásɯ deɕoR ~ nasa(ɾ)imásɯ | deɕóR, nasa(ɾ)imasɯ́ɾɯ deɕoR ~ nasa(ɾ)imasɯ́ɾɯ | deɕóR/		/nasa(ɾ)imásɯ deɕoR ~ nasa(ɾ)imásɯ | deɕóR, nasa(ɾ)imasɯ́ɾɯ deɕoR ~ nasa(ɾ)imasɯ́ɾɯ | deɕóR/	/nasa(ɾ)imasɯ(ɾɯ) mái/		
Accented	S‑irregular	de arimasu(ru) → desu (であります(る)→です; 'is')	/de | aɾimásɯ → désɯ, de | aɾimasɯ́ɾɯ/	/de | aɾimásɯ no → désɯ no, de | aɾimasɯ́ɾɯ no/	/de | aɾimásɯ deɕoR ~ de | aɾimásɯ | deɕóR, de | aɾimasɯ́ɾɯ deɕoR ~ de | aɾimasɯ́ɾɯ | deɕóR/		/de | aɾimásɯ deɕoR ~ de | aɾimásɯ | deɕóR, de | aɾimasɯ́ɾɯ deɕoR ~ de | aɾimasɯ́ɾɯ | deɕóR/	/de | aɾimasɯ(ɾɯ) mái/		
Accented	Quinquegradified	kasu(ru) (課す(る); 'assigns')	/kasɯ́ɾɯ, kásɯ/	/kasɯ́ɾɯ no, kásɯ no/	/kasɯ́ɾɯ deɕoR ~ kasɯ́ɾɯ | deɕóR, kásɯ deɕoR ~ kásɯ | deɕóR/ /kásɯ naɾi ~ kásɯ | náɾi/	/kasɯ́ɾɯ joR ~ kasɯ́ɾɯ | jóR, kásɯ joR ~ kásɯ | jóR/	/kasɯ́ɾɯ deɕoR ~ kasɯ́ɾɯ | deɕóR, kásɯ deɕoR ~ kásɯ | deɕóR/ /kasɯ́ɾɯ ɾaɕiR ~ kasɯ́ɾɯ | ɾaɕíR, kásɯ ɾaɕiR ~ kásɯ | ɾaɕíR, kásɯ ɾaɕi̥ ~ kásɯ | ɾáɕi̥/	/kasɯ(ɾɯ) ɾaɕíR, kasɯ ɾáɕi̥/ /kasɯ(ɾɯ) mái/	/kasɯ(ɾɯ) mái to/	/kásɯ ɡotoɕi̥ ~ kásɯ | ɡótoɕi̥ ~ kasɯ ɡótoɕi̥/
Accented	Quinquegradified	aisu(ru) (愛す(る); 'loves')	/aisɯ́ɾɯ, áisɯ/	/aisɯ́ɾɯ no, áisɯ no/	/aisɯ́ɾɯ deɕoR ~ aisɯ́ɾɯ | deɕóR, áisɯ deɕoR ~ áisɯ | deɕóR/ /áisɯ naɾi ~ áisɯ | náɾi/	/aisɯ́ɾɯ joR ~ aisɯ́ɾɯ | jóR, áisɯ joR ~ áisɯ | jóR/	/aisɯ́ɾɯ deɕoR ~ aisɯ́ɾɯ | deɕóR, áisɯ deɕoR ~ áisɯ | deɕóR/ /aisɯ́ɾɯ ɾaɕiR ~ aisɯ́ɾɯ | ɾaɕíR, áisɯ ɾaɕiR ~ áisɯ | ɾaɕíR, áisɯ ɾaɕi̥ ~ áisɯ | ɾáɕi̥/	/aisɯ(ɾɯ) ɾaɕíR, aisɯ ɾáɕi̥/ /aisɯ(ɾɯ) mái/	/aisɯ(ɾɯ) mái to/	/áisɯ ɡotoɕi̥ ~ áisɯ | ɡótoɕi̥ ~ aisɯ ɡótoɕi̥/
Accented	Unigradified	ronzuru, ronjiru (論ずる・論じる; 'discusses')	/ɾoNzɯ́ɾɯ, ɾoNʑíɾɯ/	/ɾoNzɯ́ɾɯ no, ɾoNʑíɾɯ no/	/ɾoNzɯ́ɾɯ deɕoR ~ ɾoNzɯ́ɾɯ | deɕóR, ɾoNʑíɾɯ deɕoR ~ ɾoNʑíɾɯ | deɕóR/ /ɾóNzɯ naɾi ~ ɾóNzɯ | náɾi/	/ɾoNzɯ́ɾɯ joR ~ ɾoNzɯ́ɾɯ | jóR, ɾoNʑíɾɯ joR ~ ɾoNʑíɾɯ | jóR/	/ɾoNzɯ́ɾɯ deɕoR ~ ɾoNzɯ́ɾɯ | deɕóR, ɾoNʑíɾɯ deɕoR ~ ɾoNʑíɾɯ | deɕóR/ /ɾoNzɯ́ɾɯ ɾaɕiR ~ ɾoNzɯ́ɾɯ | ɾaɕíR, ɾoNʑíɾɯ ɾaɕiR ~ ɾoNʑíɾɯ | ɾaɕíR, ɾóNzɯ ɾaɕiR ~ ɾóNzɯ | ɾáɕi̥/	/ɾoNzɯɾɯ ɾaɕíR, ɾoNʑiɾɯ ɾaɕíR, ɾoNzɯ ɾáɕi̥/ /ɾoNzɯɾɯ mái, ɾoNʑiɾɯ mái/	/ɾoNzɯɾɯ mái to, ɾoNʑiɾɯ mái to	/ɾóNzɯ ɡotoɕi̥ ~ ɾóNzɯ | ɡótoɕi̥ ~ ɾoNzɯ ɡótoɕi̥/
Accented	K‑irregular	kuru (来る; 'comes')	/kɯ́ɾɯ/	/kɯ́ɾɯ no/	/kɯ́ɾɯ deɕoR ~ kɯ́ɾɯ | deɕóR/ /kɯ́ naɾi/	/kɯ́ɾɯ joR ~ kɯ́ɾɯ | jóR/	/kɯ́ɾɯ deɕoR ~ kɯ́ɾɯ | deɕóR/ /kɯ́ɾɯ ɾaɕiR ~ kɯ́ɾɯ | ɾaɕíR, kɯ́ ɾaɕi̥/	/kɯɾɯ ɾaɕíR, kɯ ɾáɕi̥/ /kɯɾɯ mái/	/kɯɾɯ mái to/	/kɯ́ ɡotoɕi̥ ~ kɯ ɡótoɕi̥/
Accented	Unigradified	dekiru (出来る; 'comes into existence')	/dekíɾɯ/	/dekíɾɯ no/	/dekíɾɯ deɕoR ~ dekíɾɯ | deɕóR/ /dékɯ naɾi ~ dékɯ | náɾi/	/dekíɾɯ joR ~ dekíɾɯ | jóR/	/dekíɾɯ deɕoR ~ dekíɾɯ | deɕóR/ /dekíɾɯ ɾaɕiR ~ dekíɾɯ | ɾaɕíR, dékɯ ɾaɕi̥ ~ dékɯ | ɾáɕi̥/	/dekiɾɯ ɾaɕíR, dekɯ ɾáɕi̥/ /dekiɾɯ mái/	/dekiɾɯ mái to/	/dékɯ ɡotoɕi̥ ~ dékɯ | ɡótoɕi̥ ~ dekɯ ɡótoɕi̥/

===== Darō and deshō =====
It is possible to use the different behavior types and accent types of darō and deshō for slightly different meanings:

- "I think" (more subjective; deshō's accent is suppressed):
  - ushi o kau deshō (牛を買うでしょう; 'I think he'll buy cattle'): /ɯɕi o kaɯ́ deɕoR/
  - ushi o kau deshō (牛を飼うでしょう; 'I think he'll raise cattle'): /ɯɕi o káɯ deɕoR/
  - ushi o katta deshō (牛を買ったでしょう; 'I think he bought cattle'): /ɯɕi o kaQtá deɕoR/
  - ushi o katta deshō (牛を飼ったでしょう; 'I think he raised cattle'): /ɯɕi o káQta deɕoR/
- "Maybe" (less subjective, but still allowing for doubt; deshō's accent surfaces):
  - ushi o kau deshō (牛を買うでしょう; 'maybe he'll buy cattle'): /ɯɕi o kaɯ deɕóR/
  - ushi o kau deshō (牛を飼うでしょう; 'maybe he'll raise cattle'): /ɯɕi o káɯ | deɕóR/
  - ushi o katta deshō (牛を買ったでしょう; 'maybe he bought cattle'): /ɯɕi o kaQta deɕóR/
  - ushi o katta deshō (牛を飼ったでしょう; 'maybe he raised cattle'): /ɯɕi o káQta | deɕóR/

==== Verbal infinitive + particle ====
Particles following infinitives can be classified into the following groups (asterisked particles belong to more than one group):

- Recessive and preaccenting (RecPre):
  - Modern: wa (は), sae*, tsutsu*, ni (other uses), mo
  - Classical: te*
- Recessive and unaccented (Rec0):
  - Modern: te / de, ni (purpose)
    - The gerundive te/de triggers various sound changes (see Japanese conjugation (ren'yōkei base) § Gerund: Conjugation table).
  - Classical: te*
    - The classical gerundive te does not trigger sound changes.
- Recessive and initial-accented (Rec+1): sae*, tsutsu*, te wa (ては) / cha(a) / de wa (では) / ja(a) / te mo / de mo / te 'te / te 'cha(a) / de 'te / de 'cha(a) / te 'tari / de 'tari / te 'tara(ba) / de 'tara(ba) / te 'ya / de 'ya / te 'yo / de 'yo / te 'n no / de 'n no / te 'n ni / de 'n ni / te 'n ne / de 'n ne / te 'n de / de 'n de / te 'rya(a) / de 'rya(a) / tari / dari / tara(ba) / dara(ba)
  - The representative tari/dari and the conditional tara(ba)/dara(ba) trigger the same sound changes as te/de.
  - When te/de is followed by the subsidiary iru (see Japanese conjugation (ren'yōkei base) § Subsidiaries), it can result in various initial-accented contractions:
    - /te í wa → té ja, te í jo → té jo/
    - /te ite → té te, te ité wa → té te wa → té cɕa(R)/
    - /te itáɾi → té taɾi, te itáɾa(ba) → té taɾa(ba)/
    - /te iɾɯ́ no → te ɾɯ́ no → té N no, te iɾɯ́ no ni/ne/de → te ɾɯ́ no ni/ne/de → té N no ni/ne/de → té N ni/ne/de/
    - /te iɾéba → te iɾjá(R) → té ɾja(R)/
- Dominant and initial-accented (Dom+1): na, tsutsu*, gatera, nagara*
- Type-preserving, and unaccented or initial-accented (TypPres0+1): nagara*

Verb type			Infinitive	RecPre	Rec0	Rec+1	Dom+1	TypPres0+1
Unaccented	Modern quinquegrade Classical quadrigrade/n‑irregular	kai (買い; 'buying')	/kai/	/kaí ni/ /kaí tsɯ̥tsɯ/ /kaíte → káite/	/kai ni/ /kaQte ~ koRte, kaite/	/kai tsɯ̥́tsɯ/ /kaQtáɾi ~ koRtáɾi/ /kaQté te ~ koRté te/	/kai tsɯ̥́tsɯ/ /kai náɡaɾa/	/kai naɡaɾa/
Unaccented	Modern quinquegrade Classical quadrigrade/n‑irregular	yui (結い; 'tying hair')	/jɯi/	/jɯí ni/ /jɯí tsɯ̥tsɯ/ /jɯíte → jɯ́ite/	/jɯi ni/ /jɯQte ~ jɯRte, jɯite/	/jɯi tsɯ̥́tsɯ/ /jɯQtáɾi ~ jɯRtáɾi/ /jɯQté te ~ jɯRté te/	/jɯi tsɯ̥́tsɯ/ /jɯi náɡaɾa/	/jɯi naɡaɾa/
Unaccented	Modern quinquegrade Classical quadrigrade/n‑irregular	ii (言い; 'saying')	/iR/	/ií ni/ /ií tsɯ̥tsɯ/ /iíte → íRte/	/iR ni/ /iQte ~ jɯQte ~ jɯRte, iRte/	/iR tsɯ̥́tsɯ/ /iQtáɾi ~ jɯQtáɾi ~ jɯRtáɾi/ /iQté te ~ jɯQté te ~ jɯRté te/	/iR tsɯ̥́tsɯ/ /iR náɡaɾa/	/iR naɡaɾa/
Unaccented	Modern quinquegrade Classical quadrigrade/n‑irregular	yuki → iki (行き; 'going')	/jɯki → iki/	/jɯkí ni → ikí ni/ /jɯkí tsɯ̥tsɯ → ikí tsɯ̥tsɯ/ /jɯkí̥te/	/jɯki ni → iki ni/ /iQte, jɯki̥te/	/jɯki̥ tsɯ̥́tsɯ → iki̥ tsɯ̥́tsɯ/ /iQtáɾi/ /iQté te/	/jɯki̥ tsɯ̥́tsɯ → iki̥ tsɯ̥́tsɯ/ /jɯki náɡaɾa → iki náɡaɾa/	/jɯki náɡaɾa → iki naɡaɾa/
Unaccented	Modern quinquegrade Classical quadrigrade/n‑irregular	nari (鳴り; 'making a sound')	/naɾi/	/naɾí ni/ /naɾí tsɯ̥tsɯ/ /naɾíte/	/naɾi ni/ /naQte, naɾite/	/naɾi tsɯ̥́tsɯ/ /naQtáɾi/ /naQté te/	/naɾi tsɯ̥́tsɯ/ /naɾi náɡaɾa/	/naɾi naɡaɾa/
Unaccented	Modern quinquegrade Classical quadrigrade/n‑irregular	furi (振り; 'shaking')	/ɸɯɾi/	/ɸɯɾí ni/ /ɸɯɾí tsɯ̥tsɯ/ /ɸɯɾíte/	/ɸɯɾi ni/ /ɸɯ̥Qte, ɸɯɾite/	/ɸɯɾi tsɯ̥́tsɯ/ /ɸɯ̥Qtáɾi/ /ɸɯ̥Qté te/	/ɸɯɾi tsɯ̥́tsɯ/ /ɸɯɾi náɡaɾa/	/ɸɯɾi naɡaɾa/
Unaccented	Modern quinquegrade Classical quadrigrade/n‑irregular	shini (死に; 'dying')	/ɕini/	/ɕiní ni/ /ɕiní tsɯ̥tsɯ/ /ɕiníte/	/ɕini ni/ /ɕiNde, ɕinite/	/ɕini tsɯ̥́tsɯ/ /ɕiNdáɾi/ /ɕiNdé te/	/ɕini tsɯ̥́tsɯ/ /ɕini náɡaɾa/	/ɕini naɡaɾa/
Unaccented	Modern unigrade Classical unigrade/bigrade	i (居; 'existing')	/i/	/í ni/ /í tsɯ̥tsɯ/ /íte/	/i ni/ /ite/	/i tsɯ̥́tsɯ/ /itáɾi/ /ité te/	/i tsɯ̥́tsɯ/ /i náɡaɾa/	/i naɡaɾa/
Unaccented	Modern unigrade Classical unigrade/bigrade	hare (腫れ; 'swelling')	/haɾe/	/haɾé ni/ /haɾé tsɯ̥tsɯ/ /haɾéte/	/haɾe ni/ /haɾete/	/haɾe tsɯ̥́tsɯ/ /haɾetáɾi/ /haɾeté te/	/haɾe tsɯ̥́tsɯ/ /haɾe náɡaɾa/	/haɾe naɡaɾa/
Unaccented	Modern unigrade Classical unigrade/bigrade	mochī (用い; 'using')	/mocɕiR/	/mocɕií ni/ /mocɕií tsɯ̥tsɯ/ /mocɕiíte → mocɕíRte/	/mocɕiR ni/ /mocɕiRte/	/mocɕiR tsɯ̥́tsɯ/ /mocɕiRtáɾi/ /mocɕiRté te/	/mocɕiR tsɯ̥́tsɯ/ /mocɕiR náɡaɾa/	/mocɕiR naɡaɾa/
Unaccented	S‑irregular	shi (し; 'doing')	/ɕi/	/ɕí ni/ /ɕí tsɯ̥tsɯ/ /ɕí̥te/	/ɕi ni/ /ɕi̥te/	/ɕi̥ tsɯ̥́tsɯ/ /ɕi̥táɾi/ /ɕi̥té te/	/ɕi̥ tsɯ̥́tsɯ/ /ɕi náɡaɾa/	/ɕi naɡaɾa/
Unaccented	Quinquegradified	tasshi (達し; 'reaching')	/taQɕi/	/taQɕí ni/ /taQɕí tsɯ̥tsɯ/ /taQɕí̥te/	/taQɕi ni/ /taQɕi̥te/	/taQɕi̥ tsɯ̥́tsɯ/ /taQɕi̥táɾi/ /taQɕi̥té te/	/taQɕi̥ tsɯ̥́tsɯ/ /taQɕi náɡaɾa/	/taQɕi naɡaɾa/
Unaccented	Unigradified	ronji (論じ; 'discussing')	/ɾoNʑi/	/ɾoNʑí ni/ /ɾoNʑí tsɯ̥tsɯ/ /ɾoNʑíte/	/ɾoNʑi ni/ /ɾoNʑite/	/ɾoNʑi tsɯ̥́tsɯ/ /ɾoNʑitáɾi/ /ɾoNʑité te/	/ɾoNʑi tsɯ̥́tsɯ/ /ɾoNʑi náɡaɾa/	/ɾoNʑi naɡaɾa/
Accented	Modern quinquegrade Classical quadrigrade/r‑irregular	kai (飼い; 'rearing')	/kái/	/kái ni/ /kái tsɯ̥tsɯ/ /káite/	/kái ni/ /káQte ~ kóRte, káite/	/kái tsɯ̥tsɯ/ /káQtaɾi ~ kóRtaɾi/ /káQte te ~ kóRte te/	/kai tsɯ̥́tsɯ/ /kai náɡaɾa/	/kai náɡaɾa/
Accented	Modern quinquegrade Classical quadrigrade/r‑irregular	yui (結い; 'tying hair')	/jɯ́i/	/jɯ́i ni/ /jɯ́i tsɯ̥tsɯ/ /jɯ́ite/	/jɯ́i ni/ /jɯ́Qte ~ jɯ́Rte, jɯ́ite/	/jɯ́i tsɯ̥tsɯ/ /jɯ́Qtaɾi ~ jɯ́Rtaɾi/ /jɯ́Qte te ~ jɯ́Rte te/	/jɯi tsɯ̥́tsɯ/ /jɯi náɡaɾa/	/jɯi náɡaɾa/
Accented	Modern quinquegrade Classical quadrigrade/r‑irregular	nari (成り; 'succeeding')	/náɾi/	/náɾi ni/ /náɾi tsɯ̥tsɯ/ /náɾite/	/náɾi ni/ /náQte, náɾite/	/náɾi tsɯ̥tsɯ/ /náQtaɾi/ /náQte te/	/naɾi tsɯ̥́tsɯ/ /naɾi náɡaɾa/	/naɾi náɡaɾa/
Accented	Modern quinquegrade Classical quadrigrade/r‑irregular	ari (有り; 'existing')	/áɾi/	/áɾi ni/ /áɾi tsɯ̥tsɯ/ /áɾite/	/áɾi ni/ /áQte, áɾite/	/áɾi tsɯ̥tsɯ/ /áQtaɾi/ /áQte te/	/aɾi tsɯ̥́tsɯ/ /aɾi náɡaɾa/	/aɾi náɡaɾa/
Accented	Modern quinquegrade Classical quadrigrade/r‑irregular	de ari (であり; 'being')	/de | áɾi/		/de | áQte/	/de | áQtaɾi → dáQtaɾi/	/de | aɾi náɡaɾa/	
Accented	Modern quinquegrade Classical quadrigrade/r‑irregular	furi (降り; 'descending')	/ɸɯ́ɾi/	/ɸɯ́ɾi ni/ /ɸɯ́ɾi tsɯ̥tsɯ/ /ɸɯ́ɾite/	/ɸɯ́ɾi ni/ /ɸɯ̥́Qte → ɸɯ̥Qté, ɸɯ́ɾite/	/ɸɯ́ɾi tsɯ̥tsɯ/ /ɸɯ̥́Qtaɾi → ɸɯ̥Qtáɾi/ /ɸɯ̥́Qte te → ɸɯ̥Qté te/	/ɸɯɾi tsɯ̥́tsɯ/ /ɸɯɾi náɡaɾa/	/ɸɯɾi náɡaɾa/
Accented	Modern quinquegrade Classical quadrigrade/r‑irregular	utsuri (移り; 'being transferred')	/ɯtsɯ́ɾi/	/ɯtsɯ́ɾi ni/ /ɯtsɯ́ɾi tsɯ̥tsɯ/ /ɯtsɯ́ɾite/	/ɯtsɯ́ɾi ni/ /ɯtsɯ̥́Qte → ɯtsɯ̥Qté, ɯtsɯ́ɾite/	/ɯtsɯ́ɾi tsɯ̥tsɯ/ /ɯtsɯ̥́Qtaɾi → ɯtsɯ̥Qtáɾi/ /ɯtsɯ̥́Qte te → ɯtsɯ̥Qté te/	/ɯtsɯɾi tsɯ̥́tsɯ/ /ɯtsɯɾi náɡaɾa/	/ɯtsɯɾi náɡaɾa/
Accented	Modern quinquegrade Classical quadrigrade/r‑irregular	tsuki (付き; 'being stuck')	/tsɯ̥́ki → tsɯ̥kí/	/tsɯ̥́ki ni → tsɯ̥kí ni/ /tsɯ́ki̥ tsɯ̥tsɯ/ /tsɯ́ki̥te/	/tsɯ̥́ki ni → tsɯ̥kí ni/ /tsɯ́ite, tsɯ́ki̥te/	/tsɯ́ki̥ tsɯ̥tsɯ/ /tsɯ́itaɾi/ /tsɯ́ite te/	/tsɯki̥ tsɯ̥́tsɯ/ /tsɯ̥ki náɡaɾa/	/tsɯ̥ki náɡaɾa/
Accented	Modern quinquegrade Classical quadrigrade/r‑irregular	fushi (伏し; 'lying face-down')	/ɸɯ̥́ɕi → ɸɯ̥ɕí/	/ɸɯ̥́ɕi ni → ɸɯ̥ɕí ni/ /ɸɯ́ɕi̥ tsɯ̥tsɯ/ /ɸɯ́ɕi̥te/	/ɸɯ̥́ɕi ni → ɸɯ̥ɕí ni/ /ɸɯ́ɕi̥te/	/ɸɯ́ɕi̥ tsɯ̥tsɯ/ /ɸɯ́ɕi̥taɾi/ /ɸɯ́ɕi̥te te/	/ɸɯɕi̥ tsɯ̥́tsɯ/ /ɸɯ̥ɕi náɡaɾa/	/ɸɯ̥ɕi náɡaɾa/
Accented	Modern quinquegrade Classical quadrigrade/r‑irregular	kakushi (隠し; 'concealing')	/kakɯ̥́ɕi → kakɯ̥ɕí/	/kakɯ̥́ɕi ni → kakɯ̥ɕí ni/ /kakɯ́ɕi̥ tsɯ̥tsɯ/ /kakɯ́ɕi̥te/	/kakɯ̥́ɕi ni → kakɯ̥ɕí ni/ /kakɯ́ɕi̥te/	/kakɯ́ɕi̥ tsɯ̥tsɯ/ /kakɯ́ɕi̥taɾi/ /kakɯ́ɕi̥te te/	/kakɯɕi̥ tsɯ̥́tsɯ/ /kakɯ̥ɕi náɡaɾa/	/kakɯ̥ɕi náɡaɾa/
Accented	Modern quinquegrade Classical quadrigrade/r‑irregular	tōri (通り; 'going through')	/tóRɾi/	/tóRɾi ni/ /tóRɾi tsɯ̥tsɯ/ /tóRɾite/	/tóRɾi ni/ /tóRQte, tóRɾite/	/tóRɾi tsɯ̥tsɯ/ /tóRQtaɾi/ /tóRQte te/	/toRɾi tsɯ̥́tsɯ/ /toRɾi náɡaɾa/	/toRɾi náɡaɾa/
Accented	Modern quinquegrade Classical quadrigrade/r‑irregular	kaeri (帰り; 'going home')	/káeɾi/	/káeɾi ni/ /káeɾi tsɯ̥tsɯ/ /káeɾite/	/káeɾi ni/ /káeQte, káeɾite/	/káeɾi tsɯ̥tsɯ/ /káeQtaɾi/ /káeQte te/	/kaeɾi tsɯ̥́tsɯ/ /kaeɾi náɡaɾa/	/kaeɾi náɡaɾa/
Accented	Modern unigrade Classical unigrade/bigrade	i (射; 'shooting')	/í/	/í ni/ /í tsɯ̥tsɯ/ /íte/	/í ni/ /íte/	/í tsɯ̥tsɯ/ /ítaɾi/ /íte te/	/i tsɯ̥́tsɯ/ /i náɡaɾa/	/i náɡaɾa/
Accented	Modern unigrade Classical unigrade/bigrade	e (得; 'getting')	/é/	/é ni/ /é tsɯ̥tsɯ/ /éte/	/é ni/ /éte/	/é tsɯ̥tsɯ/ /étaɾi/ /éte te/	/e tsɯ̥́tsɯ/ /e náɡaɾa/	/e náɡaɾa/
Accented	Modern unigrade Classical unigrade/bigrade	hare (晴れ; 'clearing up')	/háɾe/	/háɾe ni/ /háɾe tsɯ̥tsɯ/ /háɾete/	/háɾe ni/ /háɾete/	/háɾe tsɯ̥tsɯ/ /háɾetaɾi/ /háɾete te/	/haɾe tsɯ̥́tsɯ/ /haɾe náɡaɾa/	/haɾe náɡaɾa/
Accented	Modern unigrade Classical unigrade/bigrade	mochī (用い; 'using')	/mocɕíR/	/mocɕíR ni/ /mocɕíR tsɯ̥tsɯ/ /mocɕíRte/	/mocɕíR ni/ /mocɕíRte/	/mocɕíR tsɯ̥tsɯ/ /mocɕíRtaɾi/ /hmocɕíRte te/	/mocɕiR tsɯ̥́tsɯ/ /mocɕiR náɡaɾa/	/mocɕiR náɡaɾa/
Accented	Modern unigrade Classical unigrade/bigrade	kangae (考え; 'deliberating')	/kaNɡáe/	/kaNɡáe ni/ /kaNɡáe tsɯ̥tsɯ/ /kaNɡáete/	/kaNɡáe ni/ /kaNɡáete/	/kaNɡáe tsɯ̥tsɯ/ /kaNɡáetaɾi/ /kaNɡáete te/	/kaNɡae tsɯ̥́tsɯ/ /kaNɡae náɡaɾa/	/kaNɡae náɡaɾa/
Accented	Modern unigrade Classical unigrade/bigrade	mōke (設け; 'establishing')	/móRke/	/móRke ni/ /móRke tsɯ̥tsɯ/ /móRkete/	/móRke ni/ /móRkete/	/móRke tsɯ̥tsɯ/ /móRketaɾi/ /móRkete te/	/moRke tsɯ̥́tsɯ/ /moRke náɡaɾa/	/moRke náɡaɾa/
Accented	Quinquegradified	nasari, nasare (為さり・為され; 'doing')	/nasáɾi, nasáɾe/	/nasáɾi ni, nasáɾe ni/ /nasáɾi tsɯ̥tsɯ, nasáɾe tsɯ̥tsɯ/ /nasáɾite, nasáɾete/	/nasáɾi ni, nasáɾe ni/ /nasáQte, nasáɾete, nasáɾite/	/nasáɾi tsɯ̥tsɯ, nasáɾe tsɯ̥tsɯ/ /nasáQtaɾi, nasáɾetaɾi/ /nasáQte te, nasáɾete te/	/nasaɾi tsɯ̥́tsɯ, nasaɾe tsɯ̥́tsɯ/ /nasaɾi náɡaɾa, nasaɾe náɡaɾa/	/nasaɾi náɡaɾa, nasaɾe náɡaɾa/
Accented	S‑irregular	‑mashi‑ (まし)		/nasa(ɾ)imáɕi̥te/				
Accented	S‑irregular	de arimashi‑ → deshi‑ (でありまし→でし)		/de | aɾimáɕi̥te → déɕi̥te/				
Accented	Quinquegradified	kashi (課し; 'assigning')	/káɕi/	/káɕi ni/ /káɕi̥ tsɯ̥tsɯ/ /káɕi̥te/	/káɕi ni/ /káɕi̥te/	/káɕi̥ tsɯ̥tsɯ/ /káɕi̥taɾi/ /káɕi̥te te/	/kaɕi̥ tsɯ̥́tsɯ/ /kaɕi náɡaɾa/	/kaɕi náɡaɾa/
Accented	Quinquegradified	aishi (愛し; 'loving')	/áiɕi/	/áiɕi ni/ /áiɕi̥ tsɯ̥tsɯ/ /áiɕi̥te/	/áiɕi ni/ /áiɕi̥te/	/áiɕi̥ tsɯ̥tsɯ/ /áiɕi̥taɾi/ /áiɕi̥te te/	/aiɕi̥ tsɯ̥́tsɯ/ /aiɕi náɡaɾa/	/aiɕi náɡaɾa/
Accented	Unigradified	ronji (論じ; 'discussing')	/ɾóNʑi/	/ɾóNʑi ni/ /ɾóNʑi tsɯ̥tsɯ/ /ɾóNʑite/	/ɾóNʑi ni/ /ɾóNʑite/	/ɾóNʑi tsɯ̥tsɯ/ /ɾóNʑitaɾi/ /ɾóNʑite te/	/ɾoNʑi tsɯ̥́tsɯ/ /ɾoNʑi náɡaɾa/	/ɾoNʑi náɡaɾa/
Accented	K‑irregular	ki (来; 'coming')	/kí/	/kí ni/ /kí tsɯ̥tsɯ/ /kí̥te/	/kí ni/ /kí̥te → ki̥té/	/kí tsɯ̥tsɯ/ /kí̥taɾi → ki̥táɾi/ /kí̥te te → ki̥té te/	/ki̥ tsɯ̥́tsɯ/ /ki náɡaɾa/	/ki náɡaɾa/
Accented	Unigradified	deki (出来; 'coming into existence')	/déki/	/déki ni/ /déki̥ tsɯ̥tsɯ/ /déki̥te/	/déki ni/ /déki̥te/	/déki̥ tsɯ̥tsɯ/ /déki̥taɾi/ /déki̥te te/	/deki̥ tsɯ̥́tsɯ/ /deki náɡaɾa/	/deki náɡaɾa/

==== Verbal infinitive + auxiliary ====
Auxiliaries following infinitives can be classified into the following groups (asterisked auxiliaries belong to more than one group):

- Recessive and unaccented (Rec0): ta / da
  - The perfect conclusive/attributive ta/da triggers various sound changes (see Japanese conjugation (ren'yōkei base) § Perfective: Conjugation table).
- Recessive and preaccenting (RecPre), classical: ki, tsu, tari*
  - The classical perfect tari does not trigger sound changes.
- Recessive and penultimate-accented (Rec−2):
  - Modern: tarō / darō
  - Pseudo-classical: taru / daru
  - Classical: tari*, ken* / kemu*
- Recessive and initial-accented (Rec+1): te 'ta / de 'ta / te 'n da / de 'n da
  - When te/de is followed by the subsidiary iru (see Japanese conjugation (ren'yōkei base) § Subsidiaries), it can result in various initial-accented contractions:
    - /te ita → té ta/
    - /te iɾɯ́ no da → te ɾɯ́ no da → té N no da → té N da/
- Dominant and preaccenting (DomPre), classical: nu, tashi*
- Dominant and penultimate-accented (Dom−2):
  - Modern: tai* / tagaru*, masu(ru) / mashō / masen, nasai, nikui, yasui
  - Classical: tashi*, ken* / kemu*
- Type-preserving, and unaccented or penultimate-accented (TypPres0−2): tai* / tagaru*
- Type-preserving, and unaccented or initial-accented (TypPres0+1): sō (da)

Verb type			Infinitive	Rec0	RecPre	Rec−2	Rec+1	DomPre	Dom−2	TypPres0−2	TypPres0+1
Unaccented	Modern quinquegrade Classical quadrigrade/n‑irregular	kai (買い; 'buying')	/kai/	/kaQta ~ koRta/	/kaítaɾi → káitaɾi/	/kaQtaɾóR ~ koRtaɾóR/ /kaitáɾi/	/kaQté ta ~ koRté ta/	/kaítaɕi̥ → káitaɕi̥/	/kaitái, kaitáɕi̥/ /kaimásɯ/	/kaitai/	/kaisoR/
Unaccented	Modern quinquegrade Classical quadrigrade/n‑irregular	yui (結い; 'tying hair')	/jɯi/	/jɯQta ~ jɯRta/	/jɯítaɾi → jɯ́itaɾi/	/jɯQtaɾóR ~ jɯRtaɾóR/ /jɯitáɾi/	/jɯQté ta ~ jɯRté ta/	/jɯítaɕi̥ → jɯ́itaɕi̥/	/jɯitái, jɯitáɕi̥/ /jɯimásɯ/	/jɯitai/	/jɯisoR/
Unaccented	Modern quinquegrade Classical quadrigrade/n‑irregular	ii (言い; 'saying')	/iR/	/iQta ~ jɯQta ~ jɯRta/	/iítaɾi → íRtaɾi/	/iQtaɾóR ~ jɯQtaɾóR ~ jɯRtaɾóR/ /iRtáɾi/	/iQté ta ~ jɯQté ta ~ jɯRté ta/	/iítaɕi̥ → íRtaɕi̥/	/iRtái, iRtáɕi̥/ /iRmásɯ/	/iRtai/	/iRsoR/
Unaccented	Modern quinquegrade Classical quadrigrade/n‑irregular	yuki → iki (行き; 'going')	/jɯki → iki/	/iQta/	/jɯkí̥taɾi/	/iQtaɾóR/ /jɯki̥táɾi/	/iQté ta/	/jɯkí̥taɕi̥/	/jɯki̥tái → iki̥tái, jɯki̥táɕi̥/ /jɯkimásɯ → ikimásɯ/	/jɯki̥tai → iki̥tai/	/jɯki̥soR → iki̥soR/
Unaccented	Modern quinquegrade Classical quadrigrade/n‑irregular	nari (鳴り; 'making a sound')	/naɾi/	/naQta/	/naɾítaɾi/	/naQtaɾóR/ /naɾitáɾi/	/naQté ta/	/naɾítaɕi̥/	/naɾitái, naɾitáɕi̥/ /naɾimásɯ/	/naɾitai/	/naɾisoR/
Unaccented	Modern quinquegrade Classical quadrigrade/n‑irregular	furi (振り; 'shaking')	/ɸɯɾi/	/ɸɯ̥Qta/	/ɸɯɾítaɾi/	/ɸɯ̥QtaɾóR/ /ɸɯɾitáɾi/	/ɸɯ̥Qté ta/	/ɸɯɾítaɕi̥/	/ɸɯɾitái, ɸɯɾitáɕi̥/ /ɸɯɾimásɯ/	/ɸɯɾitai/	/ɸɯɾisoR/
Unaccented	Modern quinquegrade Classical quadrigrade/n‑irregular	shini (死に; 'dying')	/ɕini/	/ɕiNda/	/ɕinítaɾi/	/ɕiNdaɾóR/ /ɕinitáɾi/	/ɕiNdé ta/	/ɕinítaɕi̥/	/ɕinitái, ɕinitáɕi̥/ /ɕinimásɯ/	/ɕinitai/	/ɕinisoR/
Unaccented	Modern unigrade Classical unigrade/bigrade	i (居; 'existing')	/i/	/ita/	/ítaɾi/	/itaɾóR/ /itáɾi/	/ité ta/	/ítaɕi̥/	/itái, itáɕi̥/ /imásɯ/	/itai/	/isoR/
Unaccented	Modern unigrade Classical unigrade/bigrade	hare (腫れ; 'swelling')	/haɾe/	/haɾeta/	/haɾétaɾi/	/haɾetaɾóR/ /haɾetáɾi/	/haɾeté ta/	/haɾétaɕi̥/	/haɾetái, haɾetáɕi̥/ /haɾemásɯ/	/haɾetai/	/haɾesoR/
Unaccented	Modern unigrade Classical unigrade/bigrade	mochī (用い; 'using')	/mocɕiR/	/mocɕiRta/	/mocɕiítaɾi → mocɕíRtaɾi/	/mocɕiRtaɾóR/ /mocɕiRtáɾi/	/mocɕiRté ta/	/mocɕiítaɕi̥ → mocɕíRtaɕi̥/	/mocɕiRtái, mocɕiRtáɕi̥/ /mocɕiRmásɯ/	/mocɕiRtai/	/mocɕiRsoR/
Unaccented	S‑irregular	shi (し; 'doing')	/ɕi/	/ɕi̥ta/	/ɕí̥taɾi/	/ɕi̥taɾóR/ /ɕi̥táɾi/	/ɕi̥té ta/	/ɕí̥taɕi̥/	/ɕi̥tái, ɕi̥táɕi̥/ /ɕimásɯ/	/ɕi̥tai/	/ɕi̥soR/
Unaccented	Quinquegradified	tasshi (達し; 'reaching')	/taQɕi/	/taQɕi̥ta/	/taQɕí̥taɾi/	/taQɕi̥taɾóR/ /taQɕi̥táɾi/	/taQɕi̥té ta/	/taQɕí̥taɕi̥/	/taQɕi̥tái, taQɕi̥táɕi̥/ /taQɕimásɯ/	/taQɕi̥tai/	/taQɕi̥soR/
Unaccented	Unigradified	ronji (論じ; 'discussing')	/ɾoNʑi/	/ɾoNʑita/	/ɾoNʑítaɾi/	/ɾoNʑitaɾóR/ /ɾoNʑitáɾi/	/ɾoNʑité ta/	/ɾoNʑítaɕi̥/	/ɾoNʑitái, ɾoNʑi̥táɕi̥/ /ɾoNʑimásɯ/	/ɾoNʑitai/	/ɾoNʑisoR/
Accented	Modern quinquegrade Classical quadrigrade/r‑irregular	kai (飼い; 'rearing')	/kái/	/káQta ~ kóRta/	/káitaɾi/	/káQtaɾoR ~ kóRtaɾoR/ /káitaɾi/	/káQte ta ~ kóRte ta/	/kaítaɕi̥ → káitaɕi̥/	/kaitái, kaitáɕi̥/ /kaimásɯ/	/kaitái/	/kaisóR/
Accented	Modern quinquegrade Classical quadrigrade/r‑irregular	yui (結い; 'tying hair')	/jɯ́i/	/jɯ́Qta ~ jɯ́Rta/	/jɯ́itaɾi/	/jɯ́QtaɾoR ~ jɯ́RtaɾoR/ /jɯ́itaɾi/	/jɯ́Qte ta ~ jɯ́Rte ta/	/jɯítaɕi̥ → jɯ́itaɕi̥/	/jɯitái, jɯitáɕi̥/ /jɯimásɯ/	/jɯitái/	/jɯisóR/
Accented	Modern quinquegrade Classical quadrigrade/r‑irregular	nari (成り; 'succeeding')	/náɾi/	/náQta/	/náɾitaɾi/	/náQtaɾoR/ /náɾitaɾi/	/náQte ta/	/naɾítaɕi̥/	/naɾitái, naɾitáɕi̥/ /naɾimásɯ/	/naɾitái/	/naɾisóR/
Accented	Modern quinquegrade Classical quadrigrade/r‑irregular	ari (有り; 'existing')	/áɾi/	/áQta/	/áɾitaɾi/	/áQtaɾoR/ /áɾitaɾi/	/áQte ta/	/aɾítaɕi̥/	/aɾitái, aɾitáɕi̥/ /aɾimásɯ/	/aɾitái/	/aɾisóR/
Accented	Modern quinquegrade Classical quadrigrade/r‑irregular	de ari (であり; 'being')	/de | áɾi/	/de | áQta → dáQta/		/de | áQtaɾoR → dáQtaɾoR/			/de | aɾitái/ /de | aɾimásɯ → désɯ/	/de | aɾitái/	
Accented	Modern quinquegrade Classical quadrigrade/r‑irregular	furi (降り; 'descending')	/ɸɯ́ɾi/	/ɸɯ̥́Qta → ɸɯ̥Qtá/	/ɸɯ́ɾitaɾi/	/ɸɯ̥́QtaɾoR → ɸɯ̥QtáɾoR/ /ɸɯ́ɾitaɾi/	/ɸɯ̥́Qte ta → ɸɯ̥Qté ta/	/ɸɯɾítaɕi̥/	/ɸɯɾitái, ɸɯɾitáɕi̥/ /ɸɯɾimásɯ/	/ɸɯɾitái/	/ɸɯɾisóR/
Accented	Modern quinquegrade Classical quadrigrade/r‑irregular	utsuri (移り; 'being transferred')	/ɯtsɯ́ɾi/	/ɯtsɯ̥́Qta → ɯtsɯ̥Qtá/	/ɯtsɯ́ɾitaɾi/	/ɯtsɯ̥́QtaɾoR → ɯtsɯ̥QtáɾoR/ /ɯtsɯ́ɾitaɾi/	/ɯtsɯ̥́Qte ta → ɯtsɯ̥Qté ta/	/ɯtsɯɾítaɕi̥/	/ɯtsɯɾitái, ɯtsɯɾitáɕi̥/ /ɯtsɯɾimásɯ/	/ɯtsɯɾitái/	/ɯtsɯɾisóR/
Accented	Modern quinquegrade Classical quadrigrade/r‑irregular	tsuki (付き; 'being stuck')	/tsɯ̥́ki → tsɯ̥kí/	/tsɯ́ita/	/tsɯ́ki̥taɾi/	/tsɯ́itaɾoR/ /tsɯ́ki̥taɾi/	/tsɯ́ite ta/	/tsɯ̥kítaɕi̥/	/tsɯ̥ki̥tái, tsɯ̥ki̥táɕi̥/ /tsɯ̥kimásɯ/	/tsɯ̥ki̥tái/	/tsɯ̥ki̥sóR/
Accented	Modern quinquegrade Classical quadrigrade/r‑irregular	fushi (伏し; 'lying face-down')	/ɸɯ̥́ɕi → ɸɯ̥ɕí/	/ɸɯ́ɕi̥ta/	/ɸɯ́ɕi̥taɾi/	/ɸɯ́ɕi̥taɾoR/ /ɸɯ́ɕi̥taɾi/	/ɸɯ́ɕi̥te ta/	/ɸɯ̥ɕítaɕi̥/	/ɸɯ̥ɕi̥tái, ɸɯ̥ɕi̥táɕi̥/ /ɸɯ̥ɕimásɯ/	/ɸɯ̥ɕi̥tái/	/ɸɯ̥ɕi̥sóR/
Accented	Modern quinquegrade Classical quadrigrade/r‑irregular	kakushi (隠し; 'concealing')	/kakɯ̥́ɕi → kakɯ̥ɕí/	/kakɯ́ɕi̥ta/	/kakɯ́ɕi̥taɾi/	/kakɯ́ɕi̥taɾoR/ /kakɯ́ɕi̥taɾi/	/kakɯ́ɕi̥te ta/	/kakɯ̥ɕítaɕi̥/	/kakɯ̥ɕi̥tái, kakɯ̥ɕi̥táɕi̥/ /kakɯ̥ɕimásɯ/	/kakɯ̥ɕi̥tái/	/kakɯ̥ɕi̥sóR/
Accented	Modern quinquegrade Classical quadrigrade/r‑irregular	tōri (通り; 'going through')	/tóRɾi/	/tóRQta/	/tóRɾitaɾi/	/tóRQtaɾoR/ /tóRɾitaɾi/	/tóRQte ta/	/toRɾítaɕi̥/	/toRɾitái, toRɾitáɕi̥/ /toRɾimásɯ/	/toRɾitái/	/toRɾisóR/
Accented	Modern quinquegrade Classical quadrigrade/r‑irregular	kaeri (帰り; 'going home')	/káeɾi/	/káeQta/	/káeɾitaɾi/	/káeQtaɾoR/ /káeɾitaɾi/	/káeQte ta/	/kaeɾítaɕi̥/	/kaeɾitái, kaeɾitáɕi̥/ /kaeɾimásɯ/	/kaeɾitái/	/kaeɾisóR/
Accented	Modern unigrade Classical unigrade/bigrade	i (射; 'shooting')	/í/	/íta/	/ítaɾi/	/ítaɾoR/ /ítaɾi/	/íte ta/	/ítaɕi̥/	/itái, itáɕi̥/ /imásɯ/	/itái/	/isóR/
Accented	Modern unigrade Classical unigrade/bigrade	e (得; 'getting')	/é/	/éta/	/étaɾi/	/étaɾoR/ /étaɾi/	/éte ta/	/étaɕi̥/	/etái, etáɕi̥/ /emásɯ/	/etái/	/esóR/
Accented	Modern unigrade Classical unigrade/bigrade	hare (晴れ; 'clearing up')	/háɾe/	/háɾeta/	/háɾetaɾi/	/háɾetaɾoR/ /háɾetaɾi/	/háɾete ta/	/haɾétaɕi̥/	/haɾetái, haɾetáɕi̥/ /haɾemásɯ/	/haɾetái/	/haɾesóR/
Accented	Modern unigrade Classical unigrade/bigrade	mochī (用い; 'using')	/mocɕíR/	/mocɕíRta/	/mocɕíRtaɾi/	/mocɕíRtaɾoR/ /mocɕíRtaɾi/	/mocɕíRte ta/	/mocɕiítaɕi̥ → mocɕíRtaɕi̥/	/mocɕiRtái, mocɕiRtáɕi̥/ /mocɕiRmásɯ/	/mocɕiRtái/	/mocɕiRsóR/
Accented	Modern unigrade Classical unigrade/bigrade	kangae (考え; 'deliberating')	/kaNɡáe/	/kaNɡáeta/	/kaNɡáetaɾi/	/kaNɡáetaɾoR/ /kaNɡáetaɾi/	/kaNɡáete ta/	/kaNɡaétaɕi̥ → kaNɡáetaɕi̥/	/kaNɡaetái, kaNɡaetáɕi̥/ /kaNɡaemásɯ/	/kaNɡaetái/	/kaNɡaesóR/
Accented	Modern unigrade Classical unigrade/bigrade	mōke (設け; 'establishing')	/móRke/	/móRketa/	/móRketaɾi/	/móRketaɾoR/ /móRketaɾi/	/móRkete ta/	/moRkétaɕi̥/	/moRketái, moRketáɕi̥/ /moRkemásɯ/	/moRketái/	/moRkesóR/
Accented	Quinquegradified	nasari, nasare (為さり・為され; 'doing')	/nasáɾi, nasáɾe/	/nasáQta, nasáɾeta/	/nasáɾitaɾi, nasáɾetaɾi/	/nasáQtaɾoR, nasáɾetaɾoR/ /nasáɾitaɾi, nasáɾetaɾi/	/nasáQte ta, nasáɾete ta/	/nasaɾítaɕi̥, nasaɾétaɕi̥/	/nasaɾitái, nasaɾetái, nasaɾitáɕi̥, nasaɾetáɕi̥/ /nasa(ɾ)imásɯ, nasaɾemásɯ/	/nasaɾitái, nasaɾetái/	/nasaɾisóR, nasaɾesóR/
Accented	S‑irregular	‑mashi‑ (まし)		/nasa(ɾ)imáɕi̥ta/		/nasa(ɾ)imáɕi̥taɾoR/					
Accented	S‑irregular	de arimashi‑ → deshi‑ (でありまし→でし)		/de | aɾimáɕi̥ta → déɕi̥ta/		/de | aɾimáɕi̥taɾoR → déɕi̥taɾoR/					
Accented	Quinquegradified	kashi (課し; 'assigning')	/káɕi/	/káɕi̥ta/	/káɕi̥taɾi/	/káɕi̥taɾoR/ /káɕi̥taɾi/	/káɕi̥te ta/	/kaɕí̥taɕi̥/	/kaɕi̥tái, kaɕi̥táɕi̥/ /kaɕimásɯ/	/kaɕi̥tái/	/kaɕi̥sóR/
Accented	Quinquegradified	aishi (愛し; 'loving')	/áiɕi/	/áiɕi̥ta/	/áiɕi̥taɾi/	/áiɕi̥taɾoR/ /áiɕi̥taɾi/	/áiɕi̥te ta/	/aiɕí̥taɕi̥/	/aiɕi̥tái, aiɕi̥táɕi̥/ /aiɕimásɯ/	/aiɕi̥tái/	/aiɕi̥sóR/
Accented	Unigradified	ronji (論じ; 'discussing')	/ɾóNʑi/	/ɾóNʑita/	/ɾóNʑitaɾi/	/ɾóNʑitaɾoR/ /ɾóNʑitaɾi/	/ɾóNʑite ta/	/ɾoNʑítaɕi̥/	/ɾoNʑitái, ɾoNʑitáɕi̥/ /ɾoNʑimásɯ/	/ɾoNʑitái/	/ɾoNʑisóR/
Accented	K‑irregular	ki (来; 'coming')	/kí/	/kí̥ta → ki̥tá/	/kí̥taɾi → ki̥táɾi/	/kí̥taɾoR → ki̥táɾoR/ /kí̥taɾi → ki̥táɾi/	/kí̥te ta → ki̥té ta/	/kí̥taɕi̥/	/ki̥tái, ki̥táɕi̥/ /kimásɯ/	/ki̥tái/	/ki̥sóR/
Accented	Unigradified	deki (出来; 'coming into existence')	/déki/	/déki̥ta/	/déki̥taɾi/	/déki̥taɾoR/ /déki̥taɾi/	/déki̥te ta/	/dekí̥taɕi̥/	/deki̥tái, deki̥táɕi̥/ /dekimásɯ/	/deki̥tái/	/deki̥sóR/

===== ‑tarō/‑darō vs ‑ta 'rō/‑da 'rō =====
As shown above, ‑tarō/‑darō are prescribed as single recessive and penultimate-accented forms. In actual speech however, they are more likely to be contractions of ‑ta darō/‑da darō, which can be transcribed as ‑ta 'rō/‑da 'rō. The accent in this case is slightly different; compare:

- 居たろう 'he was probably there':
  - itarō: /itaɾóR/ (the most prominent accent is on /ɾo/)
  - ita darō → ita 'rō: /itá | daɾóR → itá | ɾóR → itá ɾoR/ (the most prominent accent is on /ta/)
- 射たろう 'he probably shot it':
  - itarō: /ítaɾoR/ (the most prominent accent is on /i/)
  - ita darō → ita 'rō: /íta | daɾóR → íta | ɾóR → íta ɾoR/ (the most prominent accent is still on /i/)

==== Verbal imperative + particle ====
There is only one group of particles following imperatives. Since all imperatives are accented, the accent type of these particles does not surface:

- Recessive: to, ya, yo

Verb type			Imperative	Recessive
Unaccented	Modern quinquegrade Classical quadrigrade/n‑irregular	kae (買え; 'buy it!')	/kaé/	/kaé to/
Unaccented	Modern quinquegrade Classical quadrigrade/n‑irregular	yue (結え; 'tie your hair!')	/jɯé/	/jɯé to/
Unaccented	Modern quinquegrade Classical quadrigrade/n‑irregular	ie (言え; 'say it!')	/ié/	/ié to/
Unaccented	Modern quinquegrade Classical quadrigrade/n‑irregular	yuke → ike (行け; 'go!')	/jɯké → iké/	/jɯké to → iké to/
Unaccented	Modern quinquegrade Classical quadrigrade/n‑irregular	nare (鳴れ; 'make a sound!')	/naɾé/	/naɾé to/
Unaccented	Modern quinquegrade Classical quadrigrade/n‑irregular	fure (振れ; 'shake it!')	/ɸɯɾé/	/ɸɯɾé to/
Unaccented	Modern quinquegrade Classical quadrigrade/n‑irregular	shine (死ね; 'die!')	/ɕiné/	/ɕiné to/
Unaccented	Modern unigrade Classical unigrade/bigrade	iro, iyo (居ろ・居よ; 'exist!')	/iɾó, í jo ~ ijó/	/iɾó to, í jo to ~ ijó to/
Unaccented	Modern unigrade Classical unigrade/bigrade	harero, hareyo (腫れろ・腫れよ; 'swell!')	/haɾeɾó, haɾé jo/	/haɾeɾó to, haɾé jo to/
Unaccented	Modern unigrade Classical unigrade/bigrade	mochīro, mochiiyo (用いろ・用いよ; 'use it!')	/mocɕiRɾó, mocɕií jo/	/mocɕiRɾó to, mocɕií jo to/
Unaccented	S‑irregular	shiro, seyo (しろ・せよ; 'do it!')	/ɕiɾó, sé jo/	/ɕiɾó to, sé jo to/
Unaccented	Quinquegradified	tasshiro, tasseyo, tasse (達しろ・達せよ・達せ; 'reach it!')	/taQɕiɾó to, taQsé jo to, taQsé/	/taQɕiɾó to, taQsé jo to, taQsé to/
Unaccented	Unigradified	ronjiro, ronzeyo, ronjiyo (論じろ・論ぜよ・論じよ; 'discuss it!')	/ɾoNʑiɾó, ɾoNzé jo, ɾoNʑí jo/	/ɾoNʑiɾó to, ɾoNzé jo to, ɾoNʑí jo to/
Accented	Modern quinquegrade Classical quadrigrade/r‑irregular	kae (飼え; 'rear it!')	/káe/	/káe to/
Accented	Modern quinquegrade Classical quadrigrade/r‑irregular	yue (結え; 'tie your hair!')	/jɯ́e/	/jɯ́e to/
Accented	Modern quinquegrade Classical quadrigrade/r‑irregular	nare (成れ; 'succeed!')	/náɾe/	/náɾe to/
Accented	Modern quinquegrade Classical quadrigrade/r‑irregular	are (有れ; 'exist!')	/áɾe/	/áɾe to/
Accented	Modern quinquegrade Classical quadrigrade/r‑irregular	de are (であれ; 'be it!')	/de | áɾe/	/de | áɾe to/
Accented	Modern quinquegrade Classical quadrigrade/r‑irregular	fure (降れ; 'descend!')	/ɸɯ́ɾe/	/ɸɯ́ɾe to/
Accented	Modern quinquegrade Classical quadrigrade/r‑irregular	utsure (移れ; 'transfer!')	/ɯtsɯ́ɾe/	/ɯtsɯ́ɾe to/
Accented	Modern quinquegrade Classical quadrigrade/r‑irregular	tsuke (付け; 'stick!')	/tsɯ̥́ke → tsɯ̥ké/	/tsɯ̥́ke to → tsɯ̥ké to/
Accented	Modern quinquegrade Classical quadrigrade/r‑irregular	fuse (伏せ; 'lie face-down!')	/ɸɯ̥́se → ɸɯ̥sé/	/ɸɯ̥́se to → ɸɯ̥sé to/
Accented	Modern quinquegrade Classical quadrigrade/r‑irregular	kakuse (隠せ; 'conceal it!')	/kakɯ̥́se → kakɯ̥sé/	/kakɯ̥́se to → kakɯ̥sé to/
Accented	Modern quinquegrade Classical quadrigrade/r‑irregular	tōre (通れ; 'pass!')	/tóRɾe/	/tóRɾe to/
Accented	Modern quinquegrade Classical quadrigrade/r‑irregular	kaere (帰れ; 'go home!')	/káeɾe/	/káeɾe to/
Accented	Modern unigrade Classical unigrade/bigrade	iro, iyo (射ろ・射よ; 'shoot it!')	/íɾo, íjo/	/íɾo to, íjo to/
Accented	Modern unigrade Classical unigrade/bigrade	ero, eyo (得ろ・得よ; 'get it!')	/éɾo, éjo/	/éɾo to, éjo to/
Accented	Modern unigrade Classical unigrade/bigrade	harero, hareyo (晴れろ・晴れよ; 'clear up!')	/haɾéɾo, háɾe jo ~ haɾéjo/	/haɾéɾo to, háɾe jo ~ haɾéjo to/
Accented	Modern unigrade Classical unigrade/bigrade	mochiiro, mochiiyo (用いろ・用いよ; 'use it!')	/mocɕiíɾo, mocɕíR jo ~ mocɕiíjo/	/mocɕiíɾo to, mocɕíR jo to ~ mocɕiíjo to/
Accented	Modern unigrade Classical unigrade/bigrade	kangaero, kangaeyo (考えろ・考えよ; 'deliberate!')	/kaNɡaéɾo → kaNɡáeɾo, kaNɡáe jo ~ kaNɡaéjo/	/kaNɡaéɾo to → kaNɡáeɾo to, kaNɡáe jo to ~ kaNɡaéjo to/
Accented	Modern unigrade Classical unigrade/bigrade	mōkero, mōkeyo (設けろ・設けよ; 'establish it!')	/moRkéɾo, móRke jo ~ moRkéjo/	/moRkéɾo to, móRke jo to ~ moRkéjo to/
Accented	Quinquegradified	nasai ~ nasare, nasarero, nasareyo (為さい～為され・為されろ・為されよ; 'do it!')	/nasái ~ nasáɾe, nasaɾéɾo, nasáɾe jo ~ nasaɾéjo/	/nasái to ~ nasáɾe to, nasaɾéɾo to, nasáɾe jo to ~ nasaɾéjo to/
Accented	S‑irregular	‑mase ~ ‑mashi (ませ～まし)	/nasa(ɾ)imáse ~ nasa(ɾ)imáɕi/	/nasa(ɾ)imáse to ~ nasa(ɾ)imáɕi̥ to/
Accented	Quinquegradified	kashiro, kaseyo, kase (課しろ・課せよ・課せ; 'assign it!')	/kaɕíɾo, káse jo ~ kaséjo, káse/	/kaɕíɾo to, káse jo to ~ kaséjo to, káse to/
Accented	Quinquegradified	aishiro, aiseyo, aise (愛しろ・愛せよ・愛せ; 'love it!')	/aiɕíɾo, áise jo ~ aiséjo, áise/	/aiɕíɾo to, áise jo to ~ aiséjo to, áise to/
Accented	Unigradified	ronjiro, ronzeyo, ronjiyo (論じろ・論ぜよ・論じよ; 'discuss it!')	/ɾoNʑíɾo, ɾóNze jo ~ ɾoNzéjo, ɾóNʑi jo ~ ɾoNʑíjo/	/ɾoNʑíɾo to, ɾóNze jo to ~ ɾoNzéjo to, ɾóNʑi jo to ~ ɾoNʑíjo to/
Accented	K‑irregular	koi (来い; 'come!')	/kói/	/kói to/

==== Verbal provisional, classical verbal concessive, classical verbal hypothetical and classical ‑ri perfect ====
The provisional and classical concessive (see Japanese conjugation § Conditional) are based on the kateikei/izenkei (仮定形・已然形; lit. 'hypothetical form/realis form'), which is a bound morpheme and must combine with the following particles. The classical hypothetical (see Japanese conjugation § Provisional vs hypothetical) behaves accentually similarly to the provisional, except it is based on the mizenkei (未然形; lit. 'irrealis form'). The classical ‑ri perfect is formed with the auxiliary ‑ri, and apparently (though not etymologically) the realis for quadrigrade verbs, but the irrealis for s-irregular verbs.

- Recessive and preaccenting: ba (provisional and classical hypothetical), do (mo) (classical concessive)
- Dominant and preaccenting: ri (classical ‑ri perfect)

Verb type			Provisional	Classical concessive	Classical ‑ri perfect	Classical hypothetical
Unaccented	Modern quinquegrade Classical quadrigrade/n‑irregular	kae‑ (買え) kawa‑ (買わ)	/kaéba/	/kaédo/	/kaéɾi/	/kawába/
Unaccented	Modern quinquegrade Classical quadrigrade/n‑irregular	yue‑ (結え) yuwa‑ (結わ)	/jɯéba/	/jɯédo/	/jɯéɾi/	/jɯwába/
Unaccented	Modern quinquegrade Classical quadrigrade/n‑irregular	ie‑ (言え) iwa‑ (言わ)	/iéba/	/iédo/	/iéɾi/	/iwába/
Unaccented	Modern quinquegrade Classical quadrigrade/n‑irregular	yuke‑ → ike‑ (行け) yuka‑ → ika‑ (行か)	/jɯkéba → ikéba/	/jɯkédo/	/jɯkéɾi/	/jɯkába/
Unaccented	Modern quinquegrade Classical quadrigrade/n‑irregular	nare‑ (鳴れ) nara‑ (鳴ら)	/naɾéba/	/naɾédo/	/naɾéɾi/	/naɾába/
Unaccented	Modern quinquegrade Classical quadrigrade/n‑irregular	fure‑ (振れ) fura‑ (振ら)	/ɸɯɾéba/	/ɸɯɾédo/	/ɸɯɾéɾi/	/ɸɯɾába/
Unaccented	Modern quinquegrade Classical quadrigrade/n‑irregular	shine‑, shinure‑ (死ね・死ぬれ) shine‑ (死な)	/ɕinéba, ɕinɯɾéba/	/ɕinɯɾédo/		/ɕinába/
Unaccented	Modern unigrade Classical unigrade/bigrade	ire‑ (居れ) i‑ (居)	/iɾéba/	/iɾédo/		/íba/
Unaccented	Modern unigrade Classical unigrade/bigrade	harere‑, harure‑ (腫れれ・腫るれ) hare‑ (腫れ)	/haɾeɾéba, haɾɯɾéba/	/haɾɯɾédo/		/haɾéba/
Unaccented	Modern unigrade Classical unigrade/bigrade	mochīre‑ (用いれ) mochii‑ (用い)	/mocɕiRɾéba/	/mocɕiRɾédo/		/mocɕiíba → mocɕíRba/
Unaccented	S‑irregular	sure‑ (すれ) se‑ (せ)	/sɯɾéba/	/sɯɾédo/	/séɾi/	/séba/
Unaccented	Quinquegradified	tassure‑, tasse‑ (達すれ・達せ) tasse‑ (達せ)	/taQsɯɾéba, taQséba/	/taQsɯɾédo/	/taQséɾi/	/taQséba/
Unaccented	Unigradified	ronzure‑, ronjire‑ (論ずれ・論じれ) ronze‑ (論ぜ)	/ɾoNzɯɾéba, ɾoNʑiɾéba/	/ɾoNzɯɾédo/	/ɾoNzéɾi/	/ɾoNzéba/
Accented	Modern quinquegrade Classical quadrigrade/r‑irregular	kae‑ (飼え) kawa‑ (飼わ)	/káeba/	/káedo/	/kaéɾi/	/káwaba/
Accented	Modern quinquegrade Classical quadrigrade/r‑irregular	yue‑ (結え) yuwa‑ (結わ)	/jɯ́eba/	/jɯ́edo/	/jɯéɾi/	/jɯ́waba/
Accented	Modern quinquegrade Classical quadrigrade/r‑irregular	nare‑ (成れ) nara‑ (成ら)	/náɾeba/	/náɾedo/	/naɾéɾi/	/náɾaba/
Accented	Modern quinquegrade Classical quadrigrade/r‑irregular	are‑ (有れ) ara‑ (有ら)	/áɾeba/	/áɾedo/		/áɾaba/
Accented	Modern quinquegrade Classical quadrigrade/r‑irregular	de are‑ (であれ) nara‑ (なら)	/de | áɾeba/ /náɾa(ba)/	/náɾedo/		/náɾaba/
Accented	Modern quinquegrade Classical quadrigrade/r‑irregular	‑tare‑ (たれ) ‑tara‑ / ‑dara‑ (たら・だら)	/ítaɾeba ~ itáɾeba/ /jobítaɾeba ~ jobitáɾeba/	/ítaɾedo ~ itáɾedo/ /jobítaɾedo ~ jobitáɾedo/		/ítaɾaba ~ itáɾaba → itáɾa(ba)/ /jobítaɾaba ~ jobitáɾaba → joNdáɾa(ba)/
Accented	Modern quinquegrade Classical quadrigrade/r‑irregular	‑tare‑ (たれ) ‑tara‑ / ‑dara‑ (たら・だら)	/ítaɾeba/ /jómitaɾeba/	/ítaɾedo/ /jómitaɾedo/		/ítaɾaba → ítaɾa(ba)/ /jómitaɾaba → jóNdaɾa(ba)/
Accented	Modern quinquegrade Classical quadrigrade/r‑irregular	fure‑ (降れ) fura‑ (降ら)	/ɸɯ́ɾeba/	/ɸɯ́ɾedo/	/ɸɯɾéɾi/	/ɸɯ́ɾaba/
Accented	Modern quinquegrade Classical quadrigrade/r‑irregular	utsure‑ (移れ) utsura‑ (移ら)	/ɯtsɯ́ɾeba/	/ɯtsɯ́ɾedo/	/ɯtsɯɾéɾi/	/ɯtsɯ́ɾaba/
Accented	Modern quinquegrade Classical quadrigrade/r‑irregular	tsuke‑ (付く) tsuka‑ (付か)	/tsɯ̥́keba → tsɯ̥kéba/	/tsɯ̥́kedo/	/tsɯ̥kéɾi/	/tsɯ̥́kaba/
Accented	Modern quinquegrade Classical quadrigrade/r‑irregular	fuse‑ (伏せ) fusa‑ (伏さ)	/ɸɯ̥́seba → ɸɯ̥séba/	/ɸɯ̥́sedo/	/ɸɯ̥séɾi/	/ɸɯ̥́saba/
Accented	Modern quinquegrade Classical quadrigrade/r‑irregular	kakuse‑ (隠せ) kakusa‑ (隠さ)	/kakɯ̥́seba → kakɯ̥séba/	/kakɯ̥́sedo/	/kakɯ̥séɾi/	/kakɯ̥́saba/
Accented	Modern quinquegrade Classical quadrigrade/r‑irregular	tōre‑ (通れ) tōra‑ (通ら)	/tóRɾeba/	/tóRɾedo/	/toRɾéɾi/	/tóRɾaba/
Accented	Modern quinquegrade Classical quadrigrade/r‑irregular	kaere‑ (帰れ) kaera‑ (帰ら)	/káeɾeba/	/káeɾedo/	/kaeɾéɾi/	/káeɾaba/
Accented	Modern unigrade Classical unigrade/bigrade	ire‑ (射れ) i‑ (射)	/íɾeba/	/íɾedo/		/íba/
Accented	Modern unigrade Classical unigrade/bigrade	ere‑ / ure‑ (得れ) e‑ (得)	/éɾeba, ɯ́ɾeba/	/ɯ́ɾedo/		/éba/
Accented	Modern unigrade Classical unigrade/bigrade	harere‑, harure‑ (晴れれ・晴るれ) hare‑ (晴れ)	/haɾéɾeba, haɾɯ́ɾeba/	/haɾɯ́ɾedo/		/háɾeba/
Accented	Modern unigrade Classical unigrade/bigrade	mochiire‑ (用いれ) mochī‑ (用い)	/mocɕiíɾeba/	/mocɕiíɾedo → mocɕíRɾedo/		/mocɕíRba/
Accented	Modern unigrade Classical unigrade/bigrade	kangaere‑, kangōre‑ (考えれ・考ふれ) kangae‑ (考え)	/kaNɡaéɾeba → kaNɡáeɾeba, kaNɡóRɾeba/	/kaNɡóRɾedo/		/kaNɡáeba/
Accented	Modern unigrade Classical unigrade/bigrade	mōkere‑, mōkure‑ (設けれ・設くれ) mōke‑ (設け)	/moRkéɾeba, moRkɯ́ɾeba/	/moRkɯ́ɾedo/		/móRkeba/
Accented	Quinquegradified	nasa(re)re‑, nasarure‑ (為さ(れ)れ・為さるれ) nasara‑, nasare‑ (為さら・為され)	/nasáɾeba/ /nasaɾéɾeba, nasaɾɯ́ɾeba/	/nasáɾedo/ /nasaɾɯ́ɾedo/	/nasaɾéɾi/	/nasáɾaba/ /nasáɾeba/
Accented	S‑irregular	‑masure‑, ‑mase‑ (ますれ・ませ)	/nasa(ɾ)imasɯ́ɾeba, nasa(ɾ)imáseba/			
Accented	Quinquegradified	kasure‑, kase‑ (課すれ・課せ) kase‑ (課せ)	/kasɯ́ɾeba, káseba/	/kasɯ́ɾedo/	/kaséɾi/	/káseba/
Accented	Quinquegradified	aisure‑, aise‑ (愛すれ・愛せ) aise‑ (愛せ)	/aisɯ́ɾeba, áiseba/	/aisɯ́ɾedo/	/aiséɾi/	/áiseba/
Accented	Unigradified	ronzure‑, ronjire‑ (論ずれ・論じれ) ronze‑ (論ぜ)	/ɾoNzɯ́ɾeba, ɾoNʑíɾeba/	/ɾoNzɯ́ɾedo/	/ɾoNzéɾi/	/ɾóNzeba/
Accented	K‑irregular	kure‑ (来れ) ko‑ (来)	/kɯ́ɾeba/	/kɯ́ɾedo/		/kóba/
Accented	Unigradified	dekire‑, dekure‑ (出来れ) deko‑ (出来)	/dekíɾeba, dekɯ́ɾeba/	/dekɯ́ɾedo/		/dékoba/

==== Verbal irrealis + auxiliary ====
Irreales (未然形, mizenkei) are bound morphemes and must combine with auxiliaries, which can be classified into the following groups:

- Dominant and preaccenting, classical: mashi
- Dominant and penultimate-accented (Dom−2):
  - Modern: o (う; /R/) / yō (よう; /joR/), mai
    - The hortative/tentative o/yō were historically type-preserving. O in particular triggers various sound changes with quinquegrade verbs and the s-irregular ‑masu and desu (see Japanese conjugation (mizenkei base) § Hortative: Conjugation table).
  - Pseudo-classical: shimeru
  - Classical: n / mu, ji*, zari, shimu
- Dominant or type-preserving, and unaccented or accenting the mora before the hortative/tentative う (extended imperfect hortative/tentative): o to (うと; /R to/) / yō to (ようと; /joR to/) / o hazu (うはず; /R hazɯ/) / yō hazu (ようはず; /joR hazɯ/)
- Type-preserving, and unaccented or penultimate-accented (TypPres0−2):
  - Modern: (sa)seru, (ra)reru
  - Classical: (sa)su, (ra)ru
- Type-preserving, and unaccented or preaccenting (TypPresPre):
  - Modern eastern: nai
  - Modern western: n
  - Pseudo-classical: nu
  - Classical: ji*
- Type-preserving, and unaccented or accenting the second mora before itself, modern western/pseudo-classical: (Note: Kindaichi & Akinaga (2025:(99)–(102)) lacks any example for accented non-quinquegrade verbs. Martin (2004:376) has tabezu (食べず; /tábezɯ/ 'not eating') and warubirezu (悪びれず; /waɾɯbíɾezɯ/ 'not being daunted').) zu

Verb type			mashi	Dom−2	Extended imperfect hortative/tentative	TypPres0−2	TypPresPre	zu
Unaccented	Modern quinquegrade Classical quadrigrade/n‑irregular	kawa‑ (買わ)	/kawámaɕi/	/kawaɕiméɾɯ, kawaɕímɯ/ /kaóR, kawáN/	/kaóR hazɯ ~ kaoR hazɯ/	/kawaɾeɾɯ, kawaɾɯ/	/kawanai/ /kawaN/	/kawazɯ/
Unaccented	Modern quinquegrade Classical quadrigrade/n‑irregular	yuwa‑ (結わ)	/jɯwámaɕi/	/jɯwaɕiméɾɯ, jɯwaɕímɯ/ /jɯóR, jɯwáN/	/jɯóR hazɯ ~ jɯoR hazɯ/	/jɯwaɾeɾɯ, jɯwaɾɯ/	/jɯwanai/ /jɯwaN/	/jɯwazɯ/
Unaccented	Modern quinquegrade Classical quadrigrade/n‑irregular	iwa‑ (言わ)	/iwámaɕi/	/iwaɕiméɾɯ, iwaɕímɯ/ /ióR, iwáN/	/ióR hazɯ ~ ioR hazɯ/	/iwaɾeɾɯ, iwaɾɯ/	/iwanai/ /iwaN/	/iwazɯ/
Unaccented	Modern quinquegrade Classical quadrigrade/n‑irregular	yuka‑ → ika‑ (行か)	/jɯkámaɕi/	/jɯkaɕiméɾɯ → ikaɕiméɾɯ, jɯkaɕímɯ/ /jɯkóR → ikóR, jɯkáN/	/jɯkóR hazɯ → ikóR hazɯ ~ jɯkoR hazɯ → ikoR hazɯ/	/jɯkaɾeɾɯ → ikaɾeɾɯ, jɯkaɾɯ/	/jɯkanai → ikanai/ /jɯkaN → ikaN/	/jɯkazɯ → ikazɯ/
Unaccented	Modern quinquegrade Classical quadrigrade/n‑irregular	nara‑ (鳴ら)	/naɾámaɕi/	/naɾaɕiméɾɯ, naɾaɕímɯ/ /naɾóR, naɾáN/	/naɾóR hazɯ ~ naɾoR hazɯ/	/naɾaɾeɾɯ, naɾaɾɯ/	/naɾanai/ /naɾaN/	/naɾazɯ/
Unaccented	Modern quinquegrade Classical quadrigrade/n‑irregular	fura‑ (振ら)	/ɸɯɾámaɕi/	/ɸɯɾaɕiméɾɯ, ɸɯɾaɕímɯ/ /ɸɯɾóR, ɸɯɾáN/	/ɸɯɾóR hazɯ ~ ɸɯɾoR hazɯ/	/ɸɯɾaɾeɾɯ, ɸɯɾaɾɯ/	/ɸɯɾanai/ /ɸɯɾaN/	/ɸɯɾazɯ/
Unaccented	Modern quinquegrade Classical quadrigrade/n‑irregular	shina‑ (死な)	/ɕinámaɕi/	/ɕinaɕiméɾɯ, ɕinaɕímɯ/ /ɕinóR, ɕináN/	/ɕinóR hazɯ ~ ɕinoR hazɯ/	/ɕinaɾeɾɯ, ɕinaɾɯ/	/ɕinanai/ /ɕinaN/	/ɕinazɯ/
Unaccented	Modern unigrade Classical unigrade/bigrade	i‑ (居)	/ímaɕi/	/iɕiméɾɯ, iɕímɯ/ /ijóR, íN/	/ijóR hazɯ ~ ijoR hazɯ/	/i(ɾa)ɾeɾɯ, iɾaɾɯ/	/inai/ /iN/	/izɯ/
Unaccented	Modern unigrade Classical unigrade/bigrade	hare‑ (腫れ)	/haɾémaɕi/	/haɾeɕiméɾɯ, haɾeɕímɯ/ /haɾejóR, haɾéN/	/haɾejóR hazɯ ~ haɾejoR hazɯ/	/haɾe(ɾa)ɾeɾɯ, haɾeɾaɾɯ/	/haɾenai/ /haɾeN/	/haɾezɯ/
Unaccented	Modern unigrade Classical unigrade/bigrade	mochii‑ (用い)	/mocɕiímaɕi → mocɕíRmaɕi/	/mocɕiRɕiméɾɯ, mocɕiRɕímɯ/ /mocɕiRjóR, mocɕiíN/	/mocɕiRjóR hazɯ ~ mocɕiRjoR hazɯ/	/mocɕiR(ɾa)ɾeɾɯ, mocɕiRɾaɾɯ/	/mocɕiRnai/ /mocɕiRN/	/mocɕiRzɯ/
Unaccented	S‑irregular	sa‑, shi‑, se‑ (さ・し・せ)	/sémaɕi/	/seɕiméɾɯ, seɕímɯ/ /ɕijóR, séN/	/ɕijóR hazɯ ~ ɕijoR hazɯ/	/saɾeɾɯ, ɕiɾaɾeɾɯ, seɾaɾeɾɯ, seɾaɾɯ/	/ɕinai/ /seN/	/sezɯ/
Unaccented	Quinquegradified	tassa‑, tasshi‑, tasse‑ (達さ・達し・達せ)	/taQsémaɕi/	/taQseɕiméɾɯ, taQseɕímɯ/ /taQɕijóR, taQsóR, taQséN/	/taQɕijóR hazɯ ~ taQɕijoR hazɯ, taQsóR hazɯ ~ taQsoR hazɯ/	/taQsaɾeɾɯ, taQɕiɾaɾeɾɯ, taQseɾaɾeɾɯ, taQseɾaɾɯ/	/taQsanai, taQɕinai/ /taQsaN, taQseN/	/taQsazɯ, taQsezɯ/
Unaccented	Unigradified	ronji‑, ronze‑ (論じ・論ぜ)	/ɾoNzémaɕi/	/ɾoNzeɕiméɾɯ, ɾoNzeɕímɯ/ /ɾoNʑijóR, ɾoNzéN/	/ɾoNʑijóR hazɯ ~ ɾoNʑijoR hazɯ/	/ɾoNʑiɾaɾeɾɯ, ɾoNzeɾaɾeɾɯ, ɾoNzeɾaɾɯ/	/ɾoNʑinai/ /ɾoNʑiN, ɾoNzeN/	/ɾoNʑizɯ, ɾoNzezɯ/
Accented	Modern quinquegrade Classical quadrigrade/r‑irregular	kawa‑ (飼わ)	/kawámaɕi/	/kawaɕiméɾɯ, kawaɕímɯ/ /kaóR, kawáN/	/kaóR hazɯ/	/kawaɾéɾɯ, kawáɾɯ/	/kawánai/ /kawáN/	/káwazɯ/
Accented	Modern quinquegrade Classical quadrigrade/r‑irregular	yuwa‑ (結わ)	/jɯwámaɕi/	/jɯwaɕiméɾɯ, jɯwaɕímɯ/ /jɯóR, jɯwáN/	/jɯóR hazɯ/	/jɯwaɾéɾɯ, jɯwáɾɯ/	/jɯwánai/ /jɯwáN/	/jɯ́wazɯ/
Accented	Modern quinquegrade Classical quadrigrade/r‑irregular	nara‑ (成ら)	/naɾámaɕi/	/naɾaɕiméɾɯ, naɾaɕímɯ/ /naɾóR, naɾáN/	/naɾóR hazɯ/	/naɾaɾéɾɯ, naɾáɾɯ/	/naɾánai/ /naɾáN/	/náɾazɯ/
Accented	Modern quinquegrade Classical quadrigrade/r‑irregular	ara‑ (有ら)	/aɾámaɕi/	/aɾaɕiméɾɯ, aɾaɕímɯ/ /aɾóR, aɾáN/	/aɾóR hazɯ/	/aɾaɾéɾɯ, aɾáɾɯ/	/nái/ /aɾánai/ /aɾáN/	/áɾazɯ/
Accented	Modern quinquegrade Classical quadrigrade/r‑irregular	de ara‑ → daro‑ (であら→だろ)		/de | aɾaɕiméɾɯ/ /de | aɾóR → daɾóR/		/de | aɾaɾéɾɯ/	/de nái/ /de | aɾánai/ /de | aɾáN/	/de | áɾazɯ/
Accented	Modern quinquegrade Classical quadrigrade/r‑irregular	‑taro‑ / ‑daro‑ (たろ・だろ)		/itaɾóR/ /joNdaɾóR/				
Accented	Modern quinquegrade Classical quadrigrade/r‑irregular	‑taro‑ / ‑daro‑ (たろ・だろ)		/ítaɾoR/ /jóNdaɾoR/				
Accented	Modern quinquegrade Classical quadrigrade/r‑irregular	fura‑ (降ら)	/ɸɯɾámaɕi/	/ɸɯɾaɕiméɾɯ, ɸɯɾaɕímɯ/ /ɸɯɾóR, ɸɯɾáN/	/ɸɯɾóR hazɯ/	/ɸɯɾaɾéɾɯ, ɸɯɾáɾɯ/	/ɸɯɾánai/ /ɸɯɾáN/	/ɸɯ́ɾazɯ/
Accented	Modern quinquegrade Classical quadrigrade/r‑irregular	utsura‑ (移ら)	/ɯtsɯɾámaɕi/	/ɯtsɯɾaɕiméɾɯ, ɯtsɯɾaɕímɯ/ /ɯtsɯɾóR, ɯtsɯɾáN/	/ɯtsɯɾóR hazɯ/	/ɯtsɯɾaɾéɾɯ, ɯtsɯɾáɾɯ/	/ɯtsɯɾánai/ /ɯtsɯɾáN/	/ɯtsɯ́ɾazɯ/
Accented	Modern quinquegrade Classical quadrigrade/r‑irregular	tsuka‑ (付か)	/tsɯ̥kámaɕi/	/tsɯ̥kaɕiméɾɯ, tsɯ̥kaɕímɯ/ /tsɯ̥kóR, tsɯ̥káN/	/tsɯ̥kóR hazɯ/	/tsɯ̥kaɾéɾɯ, tsɯ̥káɾɯ/	/tsɯ̥kánai/ /tsɯ̥káN/	/tsɯ̥́kazɯ → tsɯ̥kázɯ/
Accented	Modern quinquegrade Classical quadrigrade/r‑irregular	fusa‑ (伏さ)	/ɸɯ̥sámaɕi/	/ɸɯ̥saɕiméɾɯ, ɸɯ̥saɕímɯ/ /ɸɯ̥sóR, ɸɯ̥sáN/	/ɸɯ̥sóR hazɯ/	/ɸɯ̥saɾéɾɯ, ɸɯ̥sáɾɯ/	/ɸɯ̥sánai/ /ɸɯ̥sáN/	/ɸɯ̥́sazɯ → ɸɯ̥sázɯ/
Accented	Modern quinquegrade Classical quadrigrade/r‑irregular	kakusa‑ (隠さ)	/kakɯ̥sámaɕi/	/kakɯ̥saɕiméɾɯ, kakɯ̥saɕímɯ/ /kakɯ̥sóR, kakɯ̥sáN/	/kakɯ̥sóR hazɯ/	/kakɯ̥saɾéɾɯ, kakɯ̥sáɾɯ/	/kakɯ̥sánai/ /kakɯ̥sáN/	/kakɯ̥́sazɯ → kakɯ̥sázɯ/
Accented	Modern quinquegrade Classical quadrigrade/r‑irregular	tōra‑ (通ら)	/toRɾámaɕi/	/toRɾaɕiméɾɯ, toRɾaɕímɯ/ /toRɾóR, toRɾáN/	/toRɾóR hazɯ/	/toRɾaɾéɾɯ, toRɾáɾɯ/	/toRɾánai/ /toRɾáN/	/tóRɾazɯ/
Accented	Modern quinquegrade Classical quadrigrade/r‑irregular	kaera‑ (帰ら)	/kaeɾámaɕi/	/kaeɾaɕiméɾɯ, kaeɾaɕímɯ/ /kaeɾóR, kaeɾáN/	/kaeɾóR hazɯ/	/kaeɾaɾéɾɯ, kaeɾáɾɯ/	/kaeɾánai/ /kaeɾáN/	/káeɾazɯ/
Accented	Modern unigrade Classical unigrade/bigrade	i‑ (射)	/ímaɕi/	/iɕiméɾɯ, iɕímɯ/ /ijóR, íN/	/ijóR hazɯ/	/i(ɾa)ɾéɾɯ, iɾáɾɯ/	/ínai/ /íN/	/ízɯ/
Accented	Modern unigrade Classical unigrade/bigrade	e‑ (得)	/émaɕi/	/eɕiméɾɯ, eɕímɯ/ /ejóR, éN/	/ejóR hazɯ/	/e(ɾa)ɾéɾɯ, eɾáɾɯ/	/énai/ /éN/	/ézɯ/
Accented	Modern unigrade Classical unigrade/bigrade	hare‑ (晴れ)	/haɾémaɕi/	/haɾeɕiméɾɯ, haɾeɕímɯ/ /haɾejóR, haɾéN/	/haɾejóR hazɯ/	/haɾe(ɾa)ɾéɾɯ, haɾeɾáɾɯ/	/haɾénai/ /haɾéN/	/háɾezɯ/
Accented	Modern unigrade Classical unigrade/bigrade	mochii‑ (用い)	/mocɕiímaɕi → mocɕíRmaɕi/	/mocɕiRɕiméɾɯ, mocɕiRɕímɯ/ /mocɕiRjóR, mocɕiíN/	/mocɕiRjóR hazɯ/	/mocɕiR(ɾa)ɾéɾɯ, mocɕiRɾáɾɯ/	/mocɕiínai/ /mocɕiíN/	/mocɕíRzɯ/
Accented	Modern unigrade Classical unigrade/bigrade	kangae‑ (考え)	/kaNɡaémaɕi/	/kaNɡaeɕiméɾɯ, kaNɡaeɕímɯ/ /kaNɡaejóR, kaNɡaéN/	/kaNɡaejóR hazɯ/	/kaNɡae(ɾa)ɾéɾɯ, kaNɡaeɾáɾɯ/	/kaNɡaénai/ /kaNɡaéN/	/kaNɡáezɯ/
Accented	Modern unigrade Classical unigrade/bigrade	mōke‑ (設け)	/moRkémaɕi/	/moRkeɕiméɾɯ, moRkeɕímɯ/ /moRkejóR, moRkéN/	/moRkejóR hazɯ/	/moRke(ɾa)ɾéɾɯ, moRkeɾáɾɯ/	/moRkénai/ /moRkéN/	/móRkezɯ/
Accented	Quinquegradified	nasara‑, nasare‑ (為さら・為され)	/nasaɾámaɕi, nasaɾémaɕi/	/nasaɾaɕiméɾɯ, nasaɾeɕiméɾɯ, nasaɾaɕímɯ, nasaɾeɕímɯ/ /nasaɾóR, nasaɾejóR, nasaɾáN, nasaɾéN/	/nasaɾóR hazɯ, nasaɾejóR hazɯ/	/nasaɾaɾéɾɯ, nasaɾe(ɾa)ɾéɾɯ, nasaɾáɾɯ, nasaɾeɾáɾɯ/	/nasaɾánai, nasaɾénai/ /nasaɾáN, nasaɾéN/	/nasáɾazɯ, nasáɾezɯ/
Accented	S‑irregular	‑mase‑ (ませ)		/nasa(ɾ)imaɕóR/			/nasa(ɾ)imaséN/	/nasa(ɾ)imásezɯ/
Accented	S‑irregular	de arimase‑ → desho‑ (でありませ→でしょ)		/de | aɾimaɕóR → deɕóR/			/de | aɾimaséN/	/de | aɾimásezɯ/
Accented	Quinquegradified	kasa‑, kashi‑, kase‑ (課さ・課し・課せ)	/kasémaɕi/	/kaseɕiméɾɯ, kaseɕímɯ/ /kaɕijóR, kasóR, kaséN/	/kaɕijóR hazɯ, kasóR hazɯ/	/kasaɾéɾɯ, kaɕiɾaɾéɾɯ, kaseɾaɾéɾɯ, kaseɾáɾɯ/	/kasánai, kaɕínai/ /kasáN, kaséN/	/kásazɯ, kásezɯ/
Accented	Quinquegradified	aisa‑, aishi‑, aise‑ (愛さ・愛し・愛せ)	/aisémaɕi/	/aiseɕiméɾɯ, aiseɕímɯ/ /aiɕijóR, aisóR, aiséN/	/aiɕijóR hazɯ, aisóR hazɯ/	/aisaɾéɾɯ, aiɕiɾaɾéɾɯ, aiseɾaɾéɾɯ, aiseɾáɾɯ/	/aisánai, aiɕínai/ /aisáN, aiséN/	/áisazɯ, áisezɯ/
Accented	Unigradified	ronji‑, ronze‑ (論じ・論ぜ)	/ɾoNzémaɕi/	/ɾoNzeɕiméɾɯ, ɾoNzeɕímɯ/ /ɾoNʑijóR, ɾoNzéN/	/ɾoNʑijóR hazɯ/	/ɾoNʑiɾaɾéɾɯ, ɾoNzeɾaɾéɾɯ, ɾoNzeɾáɾɯ/	/ɾoNʑínai/ /ɾoNʑíN, ɾoNzéN/	/ɾóNʑizɯ, ɾóNzezɯ/
Accented	K‑irregular	ko‑ (来)	/kómaɕi/	/koɕiméɾɯ, koɕímɯ/ /kojóR, kóN/	/kojóR hazɯ/	/ko(ɾa)ɾéɾɯ, koɾáɾɯ/	/kónai/ /kóN/	/kózɯ/
Accented	Unigradified	deki‑, deko‑ (出来)	/dekómaɕi/	/deki̥ɕiméɾɯ, deki̥ɕímɯ, dekoɕímɯ/ /dekijóR, dekíN, dekóN/	/dekijóR hazɯ/	/deki(ɾa)ɾéɾɯ, dekiɾáɾɯ, dekoɾáɾɯ/	/dekínai/ /dekíN, dekóN/	/dékizɯ, dékozɯ/

== Adjectives ==
While adjectives are also classified as "unaccented" and accented like verbs are, most adjectival forms are actually accented. The only forms that are genuinely unaccented are the imperfect attributives, and the infinitive but only if it does not precede a particle; their corresponding modern imperfect conclusive, however, has become accented among some younger speakers, especially for longer adjectives.

- akai (赤い; 'is red'):
  - Attributives: /aka(k)i/
  - Modern imperfect conclusive: /akai ~ akái/
  - Classical imperfect conclusive: /akáɕi̥/
  - Infinitive: /akakɯ → akoR/
  - Infinitive + particle: /akákɯ wa, akákɯ̥te/

Henceforth, so-called "unaccented" and "accented" adjectives will be respectively referred to as "partly accented" (PA) or "fully accented" (FA).

FA imperfect conclusives/attributives are minimally penultimate-accented, but accent shifts can occur:

- ooi → ōi (多い; 'is abundant'): /oói → óRi/
- endooi → endōi (縁遠い; 'is distantly related'): /eNdoói → eNdóRi/
- madooi → madōi (間遠い; 'is widely apart'): /madoói → madóRi ~ madoRi/
- machidooi → machidōi (待ち遠い; 'is eagerly awaited'): /macɕidoói → macɕidóRi/

All bimoraic imperfect conclusives/attributives are FA: yoi → ī (良い; /jói → íR/ 'is good'), ui (憂い; /ɯ́i/ 'is sad'), koi (濃い; /kói/ 'is concentrated'), sui (酸い; /sɯ́i/ 'is sour'), nai (無い; /nái/ 'is nonexistent').

Some compound adjectives with intense meanings may have additional irregular accent:

- ko‑ + urusai → kourusai (小+煩い→小煩い; 'small + is annoying; is fussy → is annoyingly fussy'): /ɯɾɯsái → koɯɾɯsái ~ koɯɾɯsai ~ kóɯɾɯsai/
- ko‑ + yakamashī → koyakamashī (小+喧しい→小喧しい; 'small + is annoying; is fussy → is annoyingly fussy'): /jakamaɕíR → kojakamaɕíR ~ kojakamaɕiR ~ kójakamaɕiR/
- nama + yasashī → namayasashī (生+易しい→生易しい; 'raw + simple → is plain simple'): /náma + jasaɕíR → namajasaɕiR ~ namajasaɕíR ~ námajasaɕiR/

Adjectives derived from other adjectives, verbs, and nouns tend to mirror those words' accent:

- From verbs:
  - kusuguru → kusuguttai (擽る→擽ったい; 'tickles → is ticklish'): /kɯ̥sɯɡɯɾɯ → kɯ̥sɯɡɯQtai ~ kɯ̥sɯɡɯQtái/
  - akaru → akarui (明かる→明かるい; 'shines → is bright'): /akaɾɯ → akaɾɯi/
  - kou → koishī (恋う→恋しい; 'longs for → is longed for'): /kóɯ → koiɕíR/
  - kizukau → kizukawashī (気遣う→恋しい; 'worries about → is worried'): /kizɯkáɯ → kizɯkawaɕíR/
  - sawagu → sawagashī (騒ぐ→騒がしい; 'makes noise → is noisy'): /sawáɡɯ → sawaɡaɕíR/
  - yorokobu → yorokobashī (喜ぶ→喜ばしい; 'rejoices over → is joyful'): /joɾokóbɯ → joɾokobaɕíR/
  - nayamu → nayamashī (悩む→悩ましい; 'is troubled → is troubling'): /najámɯ → najamaɕíR/
  - uramu → urameshī (恨む→恋しい; 'resents → is resentful'): /ɯɾámɯ → ɯɾameɕíR/
- From adjectives:
  - omoi → omotai (重い→重たい; 'is heavy'): /omoi → omotai/
  - nikui → nikurashī (憎い→憎らしい; 'is detestable → is odious'): /nikɯ́i → nikɯɾaɕíR/
  - kitanai → kitanarashī (汚い→汚らしい; 'is dirty'): /ki̥tanái → ki̥tanaɾaɕíR/
  - kebakebashī → kebai (けばけばしい→けばい; 'is garish'): /kebakebaɕíR → kebái/
- From common nouns:
  - maru → marui (丸→丸い; 'a circle → is round'): /maɾɯ → maɾɯi ~ maɾɯ́i/
  - kiiro → kiiroi (黄色→黄色い; 'the color yellow → is yellow'): /kiiɾo → kiiɾoi/
    - But: kimochi → kimoi (気持ち→気持い; 'a feeling → feels icky'): /kimocɕi → kimói/
  - shikaku → shikakui (四角→四角い; 'a quadrilateral → is square'): /ɕi̥kakɯ́ → ɕi̥kakɯ́i ~ ɕi̥kakɯi/
  - hidō → hidoi (非道→酷い; 'cruelty → is cruel'): /hidoR ~ hídoR → hidói/
- From adjectival nouns: all FA
  - komaka → komakai (細か→細かい; 'minute → is minute'): /komáka ~ komaká → komakái/
  - atataka → atatakai (暖か→暖かい; 'warm → is warm'): /atátaka ~ atatáka → atatakái/
  - yawaraka → yawarakai (柔らか→柔らかい; 'soft → is soft'): /jawáɾaka ~ jawaɾáka → jawaɾakái/
  - oroka → orokashī (愚か→愚かしい; 'foolish → is foolish'): /óɾoka → oɾokaɕíR/
- From reduplications and ‑shī: all FA
  - o → ooshī (雄→雄々しい; 'male → is manly'): /ó → ooɕíR/
  - me → memeshī (女→女々しい; 'female → is effeminate'): /mé → memeɕíR/
  - omo → omoomoshī (重→重々しい; 'main → is grave'): /ómo → omoomoɕíR ~ omoomoɕiR/
  - baka → bakabakashī (馬鹿→馬鹿馬鹿しい; 'an idiot → is ludicrous'): /báka → bakabakaɕíR/
  - nare → narenareshī (馴れ→馴れ馴れしい; 'familiarization → is familiar'): /naɾé → naɾenaɾeɕíR/
  - bi → bibishī (美→美々しい; 'beauty → is beautiful'): /bí → bibiɕíR/
  - doku → dokudokushī (毒→毒々しい; 'poison → is poisonous-looking'): /dokɯ́ → dokɯdokɯ̥ɕíR/

All adjectives derived from adverbs, and simplex mimetic adjectives, are FA:

- hanahada → hanahadashī (甚だ→甚だしい; 'extremely → is extreme'): /hanahada → hanahadaɕíR/
- ikaga → ikagawashī (如何→如何わしい; 'how → is unreliable'): /ikáɡa → ikaɡawaɕíR/
- choroi (ちょろい; 'is easy-peasy'): /cɕoɾói/
- toroi (とろい; 'is sluggish'): /toɾói/
- charachara → charai (ちゃらちゃら; 'showy → is showy'): /cɕáɾacɕaɾa → cɕaɾái/

Most compound mimetic adjectives are PA, although longer ones tend to be FA, and younger speakers tend to make them all FA:

- kurai → hogurai (暗い→仄暗い; 'is dark → is dusky'): /kɯɾai → honoɡɯɾái ~ honoɡɯɾai/
- kayui → muzugayui (痒い→むず痒い; 'is itchy → is creepy'): /kɯɾai → mɯzɯɡajɯ́i ~ mɯzɯɡajɯi/
- nagai → hyoronagai (長い→ひょろ長い; 'is long → is long and narrow'): /naɡái → hjoɾonaɡái ~ hjoɾonaɡai/
- nigai → horonigai (苦い→ほろ苦い; 'is bitter → is bittersweet'): /niɡái → hoɾoniɡái ~ hoɾoniɡai/

=== Verbal-infinitive–adjective compound adjectives ===
Most are FA, although some may be PA if the adjectival component is originally PA:

- kiki + tsurai → kikizurai (聞き+辛い→聞き辛い; 'hearing + is difficult → is difficult to hear'): /ki̥ki + tsɯɾai ~ tsɯɾái → ki̥kizɯɾai ~ ki̥kizɯɾái/
- mi + nikui → minikui (見+憎い→見憎い・醜い; 'seeing; looking at + is difficult → is difficult to see; is difficult to look at; is hard on the eye'): /mí + nikɯ́i → minikɯ́i/
- mi + kurushī → migurushī (見+苦しい→見苦しい; 'seeing; looking at + is arduous → is unseemly'): /mí + kɯɾɯɕíR → miɡɯɾɯɕíR/
- mi + yasui → yasui (見+易い→見易い; 'seeing; looking at + is easy → is easy to see; is easy to look at; is obvious'): /mí + jasɯ́i → mijasɯ́i/
- mushi + atsui → mushiatsui (蒸し+暑い→蒸し暑い; 'steaming + is hot → is steaming hot'): /mɯ́ɕi + atsɯ́i → mɯɕiatsɯ́i/

=== Adjectival-stem–adjective compound adjectives ===
Most are PA, although younger speakers have been making them FA. Long compounds are more likely FA:

- usu‑ + kurai → usugurai (薄+暗い→薄暗い; 'faint + is dark → is dimly lit'): /kɯɾai → ɯsɯɡɯɾai ~ ɯsɯɡɯɾái/
- ao + shiroi → aojiroi (青+白い→青白い; 'blue + is white → is pale'): /áo + ɕiɾói → aoʑiɾoi ~ aoʑiɾói/
- hoso + nagai → hosonagai (細+長い→細長い; 'narrow + is long → is long and narrow'): /hóso + naɡái → hosonaɡái/
- waru + kashikoi → warugashikoi (悪+賢い→悪賢い; 'bad + is clever → is sly'): /wáɾɯ + kaɕi̥kói → waɾɯɡaɕi̥kói/

=== Noun–adjective compound adjectives ===
If the adjectival component is originally PA, the compound can be either PA or FA, but all compounds of this kind are increasingly FA:

- te + atsui → teatsui (手+厚い→手厚い; 'a hand + is warm-hearted → is warm-hearted'): /té + atsɯi → teatsɯi ~ teatsɯ́i/
- kokoro + yoi → kokoroyoi (心+良い→快い; 'a heart + is good → is pleasant'): /kokóɾo ~ kokoɾó + jói → kokoɾojói/

=== Conjugational adjectival forms ===
Adjectives can be either partly accented or fully accented, with the following caveats:

- Partly accented (PA):
  - Only the modern and classical base imperfect attributives are always unaccented.
  - The modern base imperfect conclusive is traditionally unaccented and innovatively penultimate-accented.
  - The classical base imperfect conclusive is penultimate-accented.
  - The base infinitive is only unaccented if it is not followed by a particle. If it is, it becomes penultimate-accented, i.e. on the mora right before the infinitive consonant /k/. But since this is a voiceless consonant, it is liable to cause accented devoiced morae and potential accent shifts. As mentioned in Japanese pitch accent § Consecutive devoiceable vowels and accent, there are contradictory claims as to how these cases of accented devoiced morae should be handled. That unaccented adjectival infinitives become accented before particles is not unusual compared to unaccented verbal infinitives, with the sole exception of the gerundive particle ‑te, which only accents adjectival infinitives:
    - Verbal infinitive: /i → í wa, ite; jobi → jobí wa, joNde/
    - Adjectival infinitives: /akakɯ → akákɯ wa, akákɯ̥te/
  - All other forms are minimally accented on the mora right before the base-infinitive consonant /k/. These include the provisional, classical concessive and hypothetical, and all fusions of the base infinitive with the verb aru (有る; /áɾɯ/ 'exist'), which functions as an auxiliary to expand adjectives' conjugation. The fusions with aru will be referred to as "aru-supported forms," while the forms without aru will be "base forms." The aru-supported classical forms are additionally accented on the vowel /a/ of aru.
- Fully accented (FA):
  - Modern and classical:
    - The modern base conclusive and attributive are minimally penultimate-accented.
    - The base infinitive is traditionally minimally antepenultimate-accented (on the second mora before the base-infinitive consonant /k/), but innovatively penultimate-accented (on the mora right before /k/), which may obliterate the difference between PA and FA infinitives if there is a following particle.
    - All other forms are traditionally minimally accented on the second mora before the base-infinitive consonant /k/, but innovatively on the mora right before /k/, which presents the same problem as the base infinitive. The aru-supported FA classical forms are also additionally accented on the vowel /a/ or aru, just like PA ones.
  - Classical only:
    - The classical base ‑ki conclusive and -attributive are minimally antepenultimate-accented, i.e. on the second mora before the base-conclusive ending /ɕi̥/ and the base-attributive consonant /k/. Quadrimoraic forms are additionally penultimate-accented. Quinquemoraic or longer forms, however, are only penultimate-accented. These adjectives evolved into modern -i adjectives.
    - The classical base -shiki attributive is likewise minimally antepenultimate-accented, but the ‑shiki conclusive is penultimate-accented, as the latter is one mora shorter than the former. This means that a PA shiki-conclusive and an FA one are accentually indistinguishable. These adjectives evolved into modern shī-adjectives.
- The western infinitive (see Japanese conjugation (ren'yōkei base) § Infinitive: Conjugation table) as adapted by Tokyo speakers has the same accent location as the Tokyo infinitive. However, the innovative location is only prescribed to FA quadrimoraic or longer base infinitives.
  - Arigatō has different accent patterns as an idiom as opposed to as an infinitive:
    - arigataku → arigatō gozaimasu (有り難く→有り難うございます; 'being worthwhile → is worthwhile'): /aɾiɡátakɯ ~ aɾiɡatákɯ → ^{?}(aɾiɡátoR ɡozaimasɯ ~ aɾiɡatóR ɡozaimasɯ)/
    → arigatō (gozaimasu) (ありがとう(ございます); 'thank you'): /aɾíɡatoR (ɡozaimasɯ)/

It is not clear why the Tokyo nucleus for this particular word is irregularly /ɾí/. Some western dialects have the nucleus on the locations expected of the Tokyo dialect, namely /ɡá/ (Nagoya) and /tó/ (Osaka).

- The accent nuclei of adjectival auxiliaries do not cross morpheme boundaries and seep into their preceding words, but stay within the auxiliaries themselves. However, auxiliaries can also simply place an accent on the preceding words, rather than having nuclei within themselves to begin with.

Adjective type			Base							Aru-supported		
Adjective type			Modern imperfect conclusive	Modern imperfect attributive	Classical imperfect attributive	Classical imperfect conclusive	Classical infinitive	Modern eastern infinitive	Modern western infinitive	Classical imperfect attributive	Classical imperfect conclusive/infinitive	Classical imperative
PA	‑i	akai (赤い; 'is red')	/akai ~ akái/	/akai/	/akaki/	/akáɕi̥/	/akakɯ/		/akoR/	/akákaɾɯ ~ akakáɾɯ/	/akákaɾi ~ akakáɾi/	/akákaɾe ~ akakáɾe/
PA	‑i	atsui (厚い; 'is thick')	/atsɯi ~ atsɯ́i/	/atsɯi/	/atsɯ̥ki/	/atsɯ́ɕi̥/	/atsɯ̥kɯ/		/atsɯR/	/atsɯ̥́kaɾɯ ~ atsɯ̥káɾɯ/	/atsɯ̥́kaɾi ~ atsɯ̥káɾi/	/atsɯ̥́kaɾe ~ atsɯ̥káɾe/
PA	‑i	tōi ~ tooi (遠い; 'is far') (Note: NHK Broadcasting Culture Research Institute (2025:943) and Kindaichi & Akinaga (2025:612) only list the modern variants without any leftward shift. The website Online Japanese Accent Dictionary additionally lists the leftward-shifted variants. The leftward-shifted classical conclusive is still included in Kindaichi & Akinaga (2025:612).)	/toRi ~ toói → tóRi/	/toRi/	/toRki/	/toóɕi̥ → tóRɕi/	/toRkɯ/		/tooR/	/toókaɾɯ → tóRkaɾɯ ~ toRkáɾɯ/	/toókaɾi → tóRkaɾi ~ toRkáɾi/	/toókaɾe → tóRkaɾe ~ toRkáɾe/
PA	‑i	tsɯmetai (冷たい; 'is chilly')	/tsɯmetai ~ tsɯmetái/	/tsɯmetai/	/tsɯmetaki/	/tsɯmetáɕi̥/	/tsɯmetakɯ/		/tsɯmetoR/	/tsɯmetákaɾɯ ~ tsɯmetakáɾɯ/	/tsɯmetákaɾi ~ tsɯmetakáɾi/	/tsɯmetákaɾe ~ tsɯmetakáɾe/
PA	‑i	‑tai (たい; 'wants to')	/itai ~ itái/		/itaki ~ ítaki/	/itáɕi̥ ~ ítaɕi/	/itakɯ ~ ítakɯ/	/itakɯ ~ itákɯ/	/itoR ~ itóR/	/itákaɾɯ ~ ítakaɾɯ ~ itakáɾɯ/	/itákaɾi ~ ítakaɾi ~ itakáɾi/	
PA	‑i	‑nai (ない; 'not')	/inai/		/inaki/			/inakɯ/	/inoR/	/inákaɾɯ ~ inakáɾɯ/		
PA	‑shī	yasashī (優しい; 'is gentle')	/jasaɕiR ~ jasaɕíR/	/jasaɕiR/	/jasaɕi̥ki/	/jasáɕi̥/	/jasaɕi̥kɯ/		/jasaɕɯR/	/jasaɕí̥kaɾɯ → jasáɕi̥kaɾɯ ~ jasaɕi̥káɾɯ/	/jasaɕí̥kaɾi → jasáɕi̥kaɾi ~ jasaɕi̥káɾi/	/jasaɕí̥kaɾe → jasáɕi̥kaɾe ~ jasaɕi̥káɾe/
PA	‑shī	onajī (同じい; 'is alike')	/onaʑiR ~ onaʑíR/	/onaʑiR/	/onaʑiki/	/onáʑi/	/onaʑikɯ/		/onaʑɯR/	/onaʑíkaɾɯ ~ onaʑikáɾɯ/	/onaʑíkaɾi ~ onaʑikáɾi/	/onaʑíkaɾe ~ onaʑikáɾe/
FA	‑i	yoi → ī (良い; 'is good')	/jói → íR/		/jóki/	/jóɕi̥/	/jókɯ/		/jóR/	/jókaɾɯ ~ jokáɾɯ/	/jókaɾi ~ jokáɾi/	/jókaɾe ~ jokáɾe/
FA	‑i	nai (無い; 'is nonexistent')	/nái/		/náki/	/náɕi̥/	/nákɯ/		/nóR/	/nákaɾɯ ~ nakáɾɯ/	/nákaɾi ~ nakáɾi/	/nákaɾe ~ nakáɾe/
FA	‑i	chikai (近い; 'is near') (Note: NHK Broadcasting Culture Research Institute (2025:837) and Kindaichi & Akinaga (2025:553) only list the variants with rightward shifts away from the devoiced mora /cɕi̥/. The website Online Japanese Accent Dictionary additionally lists the unshifted variants.)	/cɕi̥kái/		/cɕí̥kaki → cɕi̥káki/	/cɕí̥kaɕi̥ → cɕi̥káɕi̥/	/cɕí̥kakɯ → cɕi̥kákɯ/		/cɕí̥koR → cɕi̥kóR/	/cɕí̥kakaɾɯ → cɕi̥kákaɾɯ ~ cɕi̥kakáɾɯ/	/cɕí̥kakaɾi → cɕi̥kákaɾi ~ cɕi̥kakáɾi/	/cɕí̥kakaɾe → cɕi̥kákaɾe ~ cɕi̥kakáɾe/
FA	‑i	aoi (青い; 'is blue')	/aói/		/áoki/	/áoɕi̥/	/áokɯ/	/áokɯ ~ aókɯ/	/áoR/	/áokaɾɯ ~ aokáɾɯ/	/áokaɾi ~ aokáɾi/	/áokaɾe ~ aokáɾe/
FA	‑i	atsui (熱い; 'is hot')	/atsɯ́i/		/átsɯ̥ki/	/átsɯ̥ɕi/	/átsɯ̥kɯ/	/átsɯ̥kɯ ~ atsɯ̥́kɯ/	/átsɯR/	/átsɯ̥kaɾɯ ~ aokáɾɯ/	/átsɯ̥kaɾi ~ aokáɾi/	/átsɯ̥kaɾe ~ aokáɾe/
FA	‑i	kowai (怖い; 'is scary')	/kowái/		/kówaki/	/kówaɕi̥/	/kówakɯ/	/kówakɯ ~ kowákɯ/	/kóoR/	/kówakaɾɯ ~ kowakáɾɯ/	/kówakaɾi ~ kowakáɾi/	/kówakaɾe ~ kowakáɾe/
FA	‑i	ooi → ōi (多い; 'is abundant')	/oói → óRi/		/óRki/	/óRɕi̥/	/óRkɯ/	/óRkɯ ~ oókɯ/	/óoR/	/óRkaɾɯ ~ oRkáɾɯ/	/óRkaɾi ~ oRkáɾi/	/óRkaɾe ~ oRkáɾe/
FA	‑i	mijikai (短い; 'is short')	/miʑikái/		/miʑíkaki ~ miʑikáki/	/miʑíkaɕi̥ ~ miʑikáɕi̥/	/miʑíkakɯ ~ miʑikákɯ/		/miʑíkoR ~ miʑikóR/	/miʑíkakaɾɯ ~ miʑikákaɾɯ ~ miʑikakáɾɯ/	/miʑíkakaɾi ~ miʑikákaɾi ~ miʑikakáɾi/	/miʑíkakaɾe ~ miʑikákaɾe ~ miʑikakáɾe/
FA	‑i	chīsai (小さい; 'is small') (Note: NHK Broadcasting Culture Research Institute (2025:836) only lists the innovative variants which are accented on the mora right before the infinitive /k/. The website Online Japanese Accent Dictionary additionally lists the apparently traditional variants with leftward shifts away from /R/.)	/cɕiRsái/		/cɕíRsaki ~ cɕiRsáki/	/cɕíRsaɕi̥ ~ cɕiRsáɕi̥/	/cɕíRsakɯ ~ cɕiRsákɯ/		/cɕíRsoR ~ cɕiRsóR/	/cɕíRsakaɾɯ ~ cɕiRsákaɾɯ ~ cɕiRsakáɾɯ/	/cɕíRsakaɾi ~ cɕiRsákaɾi ~ cɕiRsakáɾi/	/cɕíRsakaɾe ~ cɕiRsákaɾe ~ cɕiRsakáɾe/
FA	‑i	ōkī (大きい; 'is large')	/oRkíR/		/óRki̥ki ~ oRkí̥ki/			/óRki̥kɯ ~ oRkí̥kɯ/	/óRkjɯR ~ oRkjɯ́R/	/óRki̥kaɾɯ ~ oRkí̥kaɾɯ ~ oRki̥káɾɯ/		
FA	‑i	isagiyoi (潔い; 'is honorable')	/isaɡijói/		/isaɡijóki/	/isaɡijóɕi̥/	/isaɡijókɯ/	/isaɡíjokɯ ~ isaɡijókɯ/	/isaɡíjoR ~ isaɡijóR/	/isaɡijókaɾɯ ~ isaɡijokáɾɯ/	/isaɡijókaɾi ~ isaɡijokáɾi/	/isaɡijókaɾe ~ isaɡijokáɾe/
FA	‑i	beshi (可し; 'ought to')			/íɾɯ beki ~ íɾɯ | béki ~ iɾɯ béki/	/íɾɯ beɕi̥ ~ íɾɯ | béɕi̥ ~ iɾɯ béɕi̥/	/íɾɯ bekɯ ~ íɾɯ | békɯ ~ iɾɯ békɯ/			/íɾɯ bekaɾɯ ~ íɾɯ | békaɾɯ ~ íɾɯ | bekáɾɯ ~ iɾɯ békaɾɯ ~ iɾɯ bekáɾɯ/	/íɾɯ bekaɾi ~ íɾɯ | békaɾi ~ íɾɯ | bekáɾi ~ iɾɯ békaɾi ~ iɾɯ bekáɾi/	
FA	‑i	gotoshi (如し; 'is as if')			/íɾɯ ɡotoki ~ íɾɯ | ɡótoki ~ iɾɯ ɡótoki/	/íɾɯ ɡotoɕi̥ ~ íɾɯ | ɡótoɕi̥ ~ iɾɯ ɡótoɕi̥/	/íɾɯ ɡotokɯ ~ íɾɯ | ɡótokɯ ~ iɾɯ ɡótokɯ/			/íɾɯ ɡotokaɾɯ ~ íɾɯ | ɡótokaɾɯ ~ íɾɯ | ɡotokáɾɯ ~ iɾɯ ɡótokaɾɯ ~ iɾɯ ɡotokáɾɯ/	/íɾɯ ɡotokaɾi ~ íɾɯ | ɡótokaɾi ~ íɾɯ | ɡotokáɾi ~ iɾɯ ɡótokaɾi ~ iɾɯ ɡotokáɾi/	
FA	‑i	‑tai (たい; 'wants to')	/itái/		/ítaki ~ itáki/	/ítaɕi̥ ~ itáɕi̥/	/ítakɯ ~ itákɯ/	/itákɯ/	/itóR/	/ítakaɾɯ ~ itákaɾɯ ~ itakáɾɯ/	/ítakaɾi ~ itákaɾi ~ itakáɾi/	
FA	‑i	‑nai (ない; 'not')	/ínai/		/ínaki/			/ínakɯ/	/ínoR/	/ínakaɾɯ ~ inakáɾɯ/		
FA	‑shī	oshī (惜しい; 'is unfortunate')	/oɕíR/		/óɕi̥ki/	/óɕi̥/	/óɕi̥kɯ/	/óɕi̥kɯ ~ oɕí̥kɯ/	/óɕɯR/	/óɕi̥kaɾɯ ~ oɕi̥káɾɯ/	/óɕi̥kaɾi ~ oɕi̥káɾi/	/óɕi̥kaɾe ~ oɕi̥káɾe/
FA	‑shī	ooshī (雄々しい; 'is manly')	/ooɕíR/		/oóɕi̥ki/	/oóɕi̥/	/oóɕi̥kɯ/	/oóɕi̥kɯ ~ ooɕí̥kɯ/	/oóɕɯR ~ ooɕɯ́R/	/oóɕi̥kaɾɯ ~ ooɕi̥káɾɯ/	/oóɕi̥kaɾi ~ ooɕi̥káɾi/	/oóɕi̥kaɾe ~ ooɕi̥káɾe/
FA	‑shī	ureshī (嬉しい; 'is joyful')	/ɯɾeɕíR/		/ɯɾéɕi̥ki/	/ɯɾéɕi̥/	/ɯɾéɕi̥kɯ/	/ɯɾéɕi̥kɯ ~ ɯɾeɕí̥kɯ/	/ɯɾéɕɯR ~ ɯɾeɕɯ́R/	/ɯɾéɕi̥kaɾɯ ~ ɯɾeɕi̥káɾɯ/	/ɯɾéɕi̥kaɾi ~ ɯɾeɕi̥káɾi/	/ɯɾéɕi̥kaɾe ~ ɯɾeɕi̥káɾe/
FA	‑shī	onajī (同じい; 'is alike')	/onaʑíR/		/onáʑiki/	/onáʑi/	/onáʑikɯ/	/onáʑikɯ ~ onaʑíkɯ/	/onáʑɯR ~ onaʑɯ́R/	/onáʑikaɾɯ ~ onaʑikáɾɯ/	/onáʑikaɾi ~ onaʑikáɾi/	/onáʑikaɾe ~ onaʑikáɾe/
FA	‑shī	rashī (らしい; 'is likely (to)')	/íɾɯ ɾaɕiR ~ íɾɯ | ɾaɕíR ~ iɾɯ ɾaɕíR/		/íɾɯ ɾaɕi̥ki ~ íɾɯ | ɾáɕi̥ki ~ iɾɯ ɾáɕi̥ki/	/íɾɯ ɾaɕi̥ ~ íɾɯ | ɾáɕi̥ ~ iɾɯ ɾáɕi̥/	/íɾɯ ɾaɕi̥kɯ ~ íɾɯ | ɾáɕi̥kɯ ~ iɾɯ ɾáɕi̥kɯ/		/íɾɯ ɾaɕɯR ~ íɾɯ | ɾáɕɯR ~ iɾɯ ɾáɕɯR/	/íɾɯ ɾaɕi̥kaɾɯ ~ íɾɯ | ɾáɕi̥kaɾɯ ~ íɾɯ | ɾaɕi̥káɾɯ ~ iɾɯ ɾáɕi̥kaɾɯ ~ iɾɯ ɾaɕi̥káɾɯ/	/íɾɯ ɾaɕi̥kaɾi ~ íɾɯ | ɾáɕi̥kaɾi ~ íɾɯ | ɾaɕi̥káɾi ~ iɾɯ ɾáɕi̥kaɾi ~ iɾɯ ɾaɕi̥káɾi/	
FA	‑shī	maji (まじ; 'ought not to')			/íɾɯ maʑiki ~ íɾɯ | máʑiki ~ iɾɯ máʑiki/	/íɾɯ maʑi ~ íɾɯ | máʑi ~ iɾɯ máʑi/	/íɾɯ maʑikɯ ~ íɾɯ | máʑikɯ ~ iɾɯ máʑikɯ/		/íɾɯ maʑikaɾɯ ~ íɾɯ | máʑikaɾɯ ~ íɾɯ | maʑikáɾɯ ~ iɾɯ máʑikaɾɯ ~ iɾɯ maʑikáɾɯ/	/íɾɯ maʑikaɾi ~ íɾɯ | máʑikaɾi ~ íɾɯ | maʑikáɾi ~ iɾɯ máʑikaɾi ~ iɾɯ maʑikáɾi/		

==== Adjectival imperfect conclusive/attributive + particle ====
Particles following imperfect conclusives or attributives can be classified into the following groups (asterisked particles belong to more than one group):

- Recessive and preaccenting (RecPre): ka / ka i / ka na (doubt) / ka ne, ga, sa, shi, ze*, zo*, to* (quotation, enumeration) / to ka* / to te* / tte / to mo*, ni, no / no de / n de / no ni, wa (は), mo, ya, wa (yo) (わ(よ)), o, kara, da no, nado / nan te, nara(ba), nari, yori* / yori ka* / yori mo*, kashira, keredo (mo)
  - The ‑i ending of all modern adjectival conclusives/attributives can be treated as a special mora and thus cause a leftward shift.
    - The particle de can combine with the negative auxiliary ‑nai to form negative gerunds for verbs, as in inai de (see Japanese conjugation (ren'yōkei base) § Gerund: Conjugation table). In this single case, only a leftward-shifted form is prescribed.
- Recessive and unaccented (Rec0): to*, na (admiration), yo (announcement), dake*, hodo, mono no
  - Unlike the final-accented mono below, mono no is generally unaccented. See Japanese pitch accent rules §§ Noun + particle and No for more.
- Recessive and final-accented (Rec−1): ze*, zo*, ne, mono
- Recessive and initial-accented (Rec+1): ka na (exclamation), goto, sae, to ka* / to te* / to mo*, nā, nē, nomi, made, mon, yue, yori* / yori ka* / yori mo*, kurai* / gurai*, dokoro*, bakari*
  - Mon is the reduced form of the final-accented mono above. It is necessarily initial-accented as its last mora is /N/.
- Dominant and initial-accented (Dom+1): kurai* / gurai*, dokoro*, bakari*
- Dominant and deaccenting (DomDe): dake*

Adjective type			Modern base imperfect conclusive/attributive	RecPre	Rec0	Rec−1	Rec+1	Dom+1	DomDe
PA	‑i	akai (赤い; 'is red')	/akai/	/akaí to → akái to/ /akaí zo → akái zo/	/akai to/ /akai dake/ /akai mono no/	/akai zó/ /akai monó/	/akai ɡɯ́ɾai/ /akai móN/	/akai ɡɯ́ɾai/	/akai dake/
PA	‑i	atsui (厚い; 'is thick')	/atsɯi/	/atsɯí to → atsɯ́i to/ /atsɯí zo → atsɯ́i zo/	/atsɯi to/ /atsɯi dake/ /atsɯi mono no/	/atsɯi zó/ /atsɯi monó/	/atsɯi ɡɯ́ɾai/ /atsɯi móN/	/atsɯi ɡɯ́ɾai/	/atsɯi dake/
PA	‑i	tōi (遠い; 'is far')	/toRi/	/toRí to → toói to → tóRi to/ /toRí zo → toói zo → tóRi zo/	/toRi to/ /toRi dake/ /toRi mono no/	/toRi zó/ /toRi monó/	/toRi ɡɯ́ɾai/ /toRi móN/	/toRi ɡɯ́ɾai/	/toRi dake/
PA	‑i	tsɯmetai (冷たい; 'is chilly')	/tsɯmetai/	/tsɯmetaí to → tsɯmetái to/ /tsɯmetaí zo → tsɯmetái zo/	/tsɯmetai to/ /tsɯmetai dake/ /tsɯmetai mono no/	/tsɯmetai zó/ /tsɯmetai monó/	/tsɯmetai ɡɯ́ɾai/ /tsɯmetai móN/	/tsɯmetai ɡɯ́ɾai/	/tsɯmetai dake/
PA	‑i	‑tai (たい; 'wants to')	/itai ~ itái/	/itaí to ~ itái to/ /itaí zo ~ itái zo/	/itai to ~ itái to/ /itai dake ~ itái dake/ /itai mono no ~ itái mono no/	/itai zó ~ itái zo/ /itai monó ~ itái mono/	/itai ɡɯ́ɾai ~ itái ɡɯɾai ~ itái | ɡɯ́ɾai/ /itai móN ~ itái moN ~ itái | móN/	/itai ɡɯ́ɾai/	/itai dake/
PA	‑i	‑nai (ない; 'not')	/inai/	/inaí to → inái to/ /inaí zo → inái zo/ /inái de/	/inai to/ /inai dake/ /inai mono no/	/inai zó/ /inai monó/	/inai ɡɯ́ɾai/ /inai móN/	/inai ɡɯ́ɾai/	/inai dake/
PA	‑shī	yasashī (優しい; 'is gentle')	/jasaɕiR/	/jasaɕií to → jasaɕíR to/ /jasaɕií zo → jasaɕíR zo/	/jasaɕiR to/ /jasaɕiR dake/ /jasaɕiR mono no/	/jasaɕiR zó/ /jasaɕiR monó/	/jasaɕiR ɡɯ́ɾai/ /jasaɕiR móN/	/jasaɕiR ɡɯ́ɾai/	/jasaɕiR dake/
PA	‑shī	onajī (同じい; 'is alike')	/onaʑiR/	/onaʑií to → onaʑíR to/ /onaʑií zo → onaʑíR zo/	/onaʑiR to/ /onaʑiR dake/ /onaʑiR mono no/	/onaʑiR zó/ /onaʑiR monó/	/onaʑiR ɡɯ́ɾai/ /onaʑiR móN/	/onaʑiR ɡɯ́ɾai/	/onaʑiR dake/
FA	‑i	yoi → ī (良い; 'is good')	/jói → íR/	/jói to → íR to/ /jói zo → íR zo/	/jói to → íR to/ /jói dake → íR dake/ /jói mono no → íR mono no/	/jói zo → íR zo/ /jói mono → íR mono/	/jói ɡɯɾai → íR ɡɯɾai/ /jói moN → íR moN/	/joi ɡɯ́ɾai → iR ɡɯ́ɾai/	/joi dake → iR dake/
FA	‑i	nai (無い; 'is nonexistent')	/nái/	/nái to/ /nái zo/	/nái to/ /nái dake/ /nái mono no/	/nái zo/ /nái mono/	/nái ɡɯɾai/ /nái moN/	/nai ɡɯ́ɾai/	/nai dake/
FA	‑i	chikai (近い; 'is near')	/cɕi̥kái/	/cɕi̥kái to/ /cɕi̥kái zo/	/cɕi̥kái to/ /cɕi̥kái dake/ /cɕi̥kái mono no/	/cɕi̥kái zo/ /cɕi̥kái mono/	/cɕi̥kái ɡɯɾai/ /cɕi̥kái moN/	/cɕi̥kai ɡɯ́ɾai/	/cɕi̥kai dake/
FA	‑i	aoi (青い; 'is blue')	/aói/	/aói to/ /aói zo/	/aói to/ /aói dake/ /aói mono no/	/aói zo/ /aói mono/	/aói ɡɯɾai/ /aói moN/	/aoi ɡɯ́ɾai/	/aoi dake/
FA	‑i	atsui (熱い; 'is hot')	/atsɯ́i/	/atsɯ́i to/ /atsɯ́i zo/	/atsɯ́i to/ /atsɯ́i dake/ /atsɯ́i mono no/	/atsɯ́i zo/ /atsɯ́i mono/	/atsɯ́i ɡɯɾai/ /atsɯ́i moN/	/atsɯi ɡɯ́ɾai/	/atsɯi dake/
FA	‑i	kowai (怖い; 'is scary')	/kowái/	/kowái to/ /kowái zo/	/kowái to/ /kowái dake/ /kowái mono no/	/kowái zo/ /kowái mono/	/kowái ɡɯɾai/ /kowái moN/	/kowai ɡɯ́ɾai/	/kowai dake/
FA	‑i	ooi → ōi (多い; 'is abundant')	/oói → óRi/	/oói to → óRi to/ /oói zo → óRi zo/	/oói to → óRi to/ /oói dake → óRi dake/ /oói mono no/	/oói zo → óRi zo/ /oói mono → óRi mono/	/oói ɡɯɾai → óRi ɡɯɾai/ /oói moN → óRi moN/	/oRi ɡɯ́ɾai/	/oRi dake/
FA	‑i	mijikai (短い; 'is short')	/miʑikái/	/miʑikái to/ /miʑikái zo/	/miʑikái to/ /miʑikái dake/ /miʑikái mono no/	/miʑikái zo/ /miʑikái mono/	/miʑikái ɡɯɾai/ /miʑikái moN/	/miʑikai ɡɯ́ɾai/	/miʑikai dake/
FA	‑i	chīsai (小さい; 'is small')	/cɕiRsái/	/cɕiRsái to/ /cɕiRsái zo/	/cɕiRsái to/ /cɕiRsái dake/ /cɕiRsái mono no/	/cɕiRsái zo/ /cɕiRsái mono/	/cɕiRsái ɡɯɾai/ /cɕiRsái moN/	/cɕiRsai ɡɯ́ɾai/	/cɕiRsai dake/
FA	‑i	ōkī (大きい; 'is large')	/oRkíR/	/oRkíR to/ /oRkíR zo/	/oRkíR to/ /oRkíR dake/ /oRkíR mono no/	/oRkíR zo/ /oRkíR mono/	/oRkíR ɡɯɾai/ /oRkíR moN/	/oRkiR ɡɯ́ɾai/	/oRkiR dake/
FA	‑i	isagiyoi (潔い; 'is honorable')	/isaɡijói/	/isaɡijói to/ /isaɡijói zo/	/isaɡijói to/ /isaɡijói dake/ /isaɡijói mono no/	/isaɡijói zo/ /isaɡijói mono/	/isaɡijói ɡɯɾai/ /isaɡijói moN/	/isaɡijoi ɡɯ́ɾai/	/isaɡijoi dake/
FA	‑i	‑tai (たい; 'wants to')	/itái/	/itái to/ /itái zo/	/itái to/ /itái dake/ /itái mono no/	/itái zo/ /itái mono/	/itái ɡɯɾai ~ itái | ɡɯ́ɾai/ /itái moN ~ itái | móN/	/itai ɡɯ́ɾai/	/itai dake/
FA	‑i	‑nai (ない; 'not')	/ínai/	/ínai to/ /ínai zo/ /ínai de/	/ínai to/ /ínai dake/ /ínai mono no/	/ínai zo/ /ínai mono/	/ínai ɡɯɾai ~ ínai | ɡɯ́ɾai/ /ínai moN ~ ínai | móN/	/inai ɡɯ́ɾai/	/inai dake/
FA	‑shī	oshī (惜しい; 'is unfortunate')	/oɕíR/	/oɕíR to/ /oɕíR zo/	/oɕíR to/ /oɕíR dake/ /oɕíR mono no/	/oɕíR zo/ /oɕíR mono/	/oɕíR ɡɯɾai/ /oɕíR moN/	/oɕiR ɡɯ́ɾai/	/oɕiR dake/
FA	‑shī	ooshī (雄々しい; 'is manly')	/ooɕíR/	/ooɕíR to/ /ooɕíR zo/	/ooɕíR to/ /ooɕíR dake/ /ooɕíR mono no/	/ooɕíR zo/ /ooɕíR mono/	/ooɕíR ɡɯɾai/ /ooɕíR moN/	/ooɕiR ɡɯ́ɾai/	/ooɕiR dake/
FA	‑shī	ureshī (嬉しい; 'is joyful')	/ɯɾeɕíR/	/ɯɾeɕíR to/ /ɯɾeɕíR zo/	/ɯɾeɕíR to/ /ɯɾeɕíR dake/ /ɯɾeɕíR mono no/	/ɯɾeɕíR zo/ /ɯɾeɕíR mono/	/ɯɾeɕíR ɡɯɾai/ /ɯɾeɕíR moN/	/ɯɾeɕiR ɡɯ́ɾai/	/ɯɾeɕiR dake/
FA	‑shī	onajī (同じい; 'is alike')	/onaʑíR/	/onaʑíR to/ /onaʑíR zo/	/onaʑíR to/ /onaʑíR dake/ /onaʑíR mono no/	/onaʑíR zo/ /onaʑíR mono/	/onaʑíR ɡɯɾai/ /onaʑíR moN/	/onaʑiR ɡɯ́ɾai/	/onaʑiR dake/
FA	‑shī	rashī (らしい; 'is as if')	/íɾɯ ɾaɕiR ~ íɾɯ | ɾaɕíR ~ iɾɯ ɾaɕíR/	/íɾɯ ɾaɕiR to ~ íɾɯ | ɾaɕíR to ~ iɾɯ ɾaɕíR to/ /íɾɯ ɾaɕiR zo ~ íɾɯ | ɾaɕíR zo ~ iɾɯ ɾaɕíR zo/	/íɾɯ ɾaɕiR to ~ íɾɯ | ɾaɕíR to ~ iɾɯ ɾaɕíR to/ /íɾɯ ɾaɕiR dake ~ íɾɯ | ɾaɕíR dake ~ iɾɯ ɾaɕíR dake /íɾɯ ɾaɕiR no ~ íɾɯ | ɾaɕíR no ~ iɾɯ ɾaɕíR no/	/íɾɯ ɾaɕiR zo ~ íɾɯ | ɾaɕíR zo ~ iɾɯ ɾaɕíR zo/ /íɾɯ ɾaɕiR mono ~ íɾɯ | ɾaɕíR mono ~ iɾɯ ɾaɕíR mono/	/íɾɯ ɾaɕiR ɡɯɾai ~ íɾɯ | ɾaɕíR ɡɯɾai ~ íɾɯ ɾaɕiR | ɡɯ́ɾai ~ íɾɯ | ɾaɕíR | ɡɯ́ɾai ~ iɾɯ ɾaɕíR ɡɯɾai ~ iɾɯ ɾaɕíR | ɡɯ́ɾai/ /íɾɯ ɾaɕiR moN ~ íɾɯ | ɾaɕíR moN ~ íɾɯ ɾaɕiR | móN ~ íɾɯ | ɾaɕíR | móN ~ iɾɯ ɾaɕíR moN ~ iɾɯ ɾaɕíR | móN/	/íɾɯ ɾaɕiR ɡɯɾai ~ íɾɯ | ɾaɕíR ɡɯɾai ~ íɾɯ ɾaɕiR | ɡɯ́ɾai ~ íɾɯ | ɾaɕíR | ɡɯ́ɾai ~ iɾɯ ɾaɕíR ɡɯɾai ~ iɾɯ ɾaɕíR | ɡɯ́ɾai/	/iɾɯ ɾaɕiR dake/

==== Adjectival imperfect conclusive/attributive + auxiliary ====
Auxiliaries following imperfect conclusives or attributives can be classified into the following groups (asterisked auxiliaries belong to more than one group):

- Recessive and preaccenting (RecPre): no (da) / n da
- Recessive and preaccenting and penultimate-accented (RecPre−2):
  - Modern: darō*, desu / deshō*, no desu / n desu
  - Classical: nari
- Recessive and initial-accented (Rec+1): sō (da), yō (da), mitai (da)
- Recessive and penultimate-accented (Rec−2):
  - Modern: darō*, deshō*, rashī*
  - Classical: beshi*, rashi*, maji*, ran* / ramu*
- Dominant and penultimate-accented (Dom−2):
  - Modern: rashī*
  - Classical: beshi*, rashi*, maji*, ran* / ramu*
- Recessive or dominant, antepenultimate-accented, classical: gotoshi

Adjective type			Modern base imperfect conclusive/attributive	RecPre	RecPre−2	Rec+1	Rec−2	Dom−2	Classical aru-supported attributive	Rec−2 ~ Dom−2	gotoshi
PA	‑i	akai (赤い; 'is red')	/akai/	/akaí no → akái no/	/akaí deɕoR → akái deɕoR ~ akaí | deɕóR → akái | deɕóR/	/akai jóR/	/akai deɕóR/ /akai ɾaɕíR/	/akai ɾaɕíR/	/akákaɾɯ ~ akakáɾɯ/	/akákaɾɯ beɕi̥ ~ akákaɾɯ | béɕi̥ ~ akakáɾɯ beɕi̥ ~ akakáɾɯ | béɕi̥ ~ akakaɾɯ béɕi̥/	/akákaɾɯ ɡotoɕi̥ ~ akákaɾɯ | ɡótoɕi̥ ~ akakáɾɯ ɡotoɕi̥ ~ akakáɾɯ | ɡótoɕi̥ ~ akakaɾɯ ɡótoɕi̥/
PA	‑i	atsui (厚い; 'is thick')	/atsɯi/	/atsɯí no → atsɯ́i no/	/atsɯí deɕoR → atsɯ́i deɕoR ~ atsɯí | deɕóR → atsɯ́i | deɕóR/	/atsɯi jóR/	/atsɯi deɕóR/ /atsɯi ɾaɕíR/	/atsɯi ɾaɕíR/	/atsɯ̥́kaɾɯ ~ atsɯ̥káɾɯ/	/atsɯ̥́kaɾɯ beɕi̥ ~ atsɯ̥́kaɾɯ | béɕi̥ ~ atsɯ̥káɾɯ beɕi̥ ~ atsɯ̥káɾɯ | béɕi̥ ~ atsɯ̥kaɾɯ béɕi̥/	/atsɯ̥́kaɾɯ ɡotoɕi̥ ~ atsɯ̥́kaɾɯ | ɡótoɕi̥ ~ atsɯ̥káɾɯ ɡotoɕi̥ ~ atsɯ̥káɾɯ | ɡótoɕi̥ ~ atsɯ̥kaɾɯ ɡótoɕi̥/
PA	‑i	tōi (遠い; 'is far')	/toRi/	/toRí no → toói no → tóRi no/	/toRí deɕoR → toói deɕoR → tóRi deɕoR ~ toRí | deɕóR → toói | deɕóR → tóRi | deɕóR/	/toRi jóR/	/toRi deɕóR/ /toRi ɾaɕíR/	/toRi ɾaɕíR/	/toókaɾɯ → tóRkaɾɯ ~ toRkáɾɯ/	/toókaɾɯ beɕi̥ → tóRkaɾɯ beɕi̥ ~ toókaɾɯ | béɕi̥ → tóRkaɾɯ | béɕi̥ ~ toRkáɾɯ beɕi̥ → toRkáɾɯ | béɕi̥ ~ toRkaɾɯ béɕi̥/	/toókaɾɯ ɡotoɕi̥ → tóRkaɾɯ ɡotoɕi̥ ~ toókaɾɯ | ɡótoɕi̥ → tóRkaɾɯ | ɡótoɕi̥ ~ toRkáɾɯ ɡotoɕi̥ → toRkáɾɯ | ɡótoɕi̥ ~ toRkaɾɯ ɡótoɕi̥/
PA	‑i	tsɯmetai (冷たい; 'is chilly')	/tsɯmetai/	/tsɯmetaí no → tsɯmetái no/	/tsɯmetaí deɕoR → tsɯmetái deɕoR ~ tsɯmetaí | deɕóR → tsɯmetái | deɕóR/	/tsɯmetai jóR/	/tsɯmetai deɕóR/ /tsɯmetai ɾaɕíR/	/tsɯmetai ɾaɕíR/	/tsɯmetákaɾɯ ~ tsɯmetakáɾɯ/	/tsɯmetákaɾɯ beɕi̥ ~ tsɯmetákaɾɯ | béɕi̥ ~ tsɯmetakáɾɯ beɕi̥ ~ tsɯmetakáɾɯ | béɕi̥ ~ tsɯmetakaɾɯ béɕi̥/	/tsɯmetákaɾɯ ɡotoɕi̥ ~ tsɯmetákaɾɯ | ɡótoɕi̥ ~ tsɯmetakáɾɯ ɡotoɕi̥ ~ tsɯmetakáɾɯ | ɡótoɕi̥ ~ tsɯmetakaɾɯ ɡótoɕi̥/
PA	‑i	‑tai (たい; 'wants to')	/itai ~ itái/	/itaí no ~ itái no/	/itaí deɕoR ~ itaí | deɕóR ~ itái deɕoR ~ itái | deɕóR/	/itai jóR ~ itái joR/	/itai deɕóR ~ itái deɕoR ~ itái | deɕóR/ /itai ɾaɕíR ~ itái ɾaɕiR ~ itái | ɾaɕíR/	/itai ɾaɕíR/	/itákaɾɯ ~ ítakaɾɯ ~ itakáɾɯ/	/itákaɾɯ beɕi̥ ~ itákaɾɯ | béɕi̥ ~ ítakaɾɯ beɕi̥ ~ ítakaɾɯ | béɕi̥ ~ itakáɾɯ beɕi̥ ~ itakáɾɯ | béɕi̥ ~ itakaɾɯ béɕi̥/	/itákaɾɯ ɡotoɕi̥ ~ itákaɾɯ | ɡótoɕi̥ ~ ítakaɾɯ ɡotoɕi̥ ~ ítakaɾɯ | ɡótoɕi̥ ~ itakáɾɯ ɡotoɕi̥ ~ itakáɾɯ | ɡótoɕi̥ ~ itakaɾɯ ɡótoɕi̥/
PA	‑i	‑nai (ない; 'not')	/inai/	/inaí no → inái no/	/inaí deɕoR → inái deɕoR ~ inaí | deɕóR → inái | deɕóR/	/inai jóR/	/inai deɕóR/ /inai ɾaɕíR/	/inai ɾaɕíR/	/inákaɾɯ ~ inakáɾɯ/	/inákaɾɯ beɕi̥ ~ inákaɾɯ | béɕi̥ ~ inakáɾɯ beɕi̥ ~ inakáɾɯ | béɕi̥ ~ inakaɾɯ béɕi̥/	/inákaɾɯ ɡotoɕi̥ ~ inákaɾɯ | ɡótoɕi̥ ~ inakáɾɯ ɡotoɕi̥ ~ inakáɾɯ | ɡótoɕi̥ ~ inakaɾɯ ɡótoɕi̥/
PA	‑shī	yasashī (優しい; 'is gentle')	/jasaɕiR/	/jasaɕií no → jasaɕíR no/	/jasaɕií deɕoR → jasaɕíR deɕoR ~ jasaɕií | deɕóR → jasaɕíR | deɕóR/	/jasaɕiR jóR/	/jasaɕiR deɕóR/ /jasaɕiR ɾaɕíR/	/jasaɕiR ɾaɕíR/	/jasaɕí̥kaɾɯ → jasáɕi̥kaɾɯ ~ jasaɕi̥káɾɯ/	/jasaɕí̥kaɾɯ beɕi̥ → jasáɕi̥kaɾɯ beɕi̥ ~ jasaɕí̥kaɾɯ | béɕi̥ → jasáɕi̥kaɾɯ | béɕi̥ ~ jasaɕi̥káɾɯ beɕi̥ ~ jasaɕi̥káɾɯ | béɕi̥ ~ jasaɕi̥kaɾɯ béɕi̥/	/jasaɕí̥kaɾɯ ɡotoɕi̥ → jasáɕi̥kaɾɯ ɡotoɕi̥ ~ jasaɕí̥kaɾɯ | ɡótoɕi̥ → jasáɕi̥kaɾɯ | ɡótoɕi̥ ~ jasaɕi̥káɾɯ ɡotoɕi̥ ~ jasaɕi̥káɾɯ | ɡótoɕi̥ ~ jasaɕi̥kaɾɯ ɡótoɕi̥/
PA	‑shī	onajī (同じい; 'is alike')	/onaʑiR/	/onaʑií no → onaʑíR no/	/onaʑií deɕoR → onaʑíR deɕoR ~ onaʑií | deɕóR → onaʑíR | deɕóR/	/onaʑiR jóR/	/onaʑiR deɕóR/ /onaʑiR ɾaɕíR/	/onaʑiR ɾaɕíR/	/onaʑíkaɾɯ ~ onaʑikáɾɯ/	/onaʑíkaɾɯ beɕi̥ ~ onaʑíkaɾɯ | béɕi̥ ~ onaʑikáɾɯ beɕi̥ ~ onaʑikáɾɯ | béɕi̥ ~ onaʑikaɾɯ béɕi̥/	/onaʑíkaɾɯ ɡotoɕi̥ ~ onaʑíkaɾɯ | ɡótoɕi̥ ~ onaʑikáɾɯ ɡotoɕi̥ ~ onaʑikáɾɯ | ɡótoɕi̥ ~ onaʑikaɾɯ ɡótoɕi̥/
FA	‑i	yoi → ī (良い; 'is good')	/jói → íR/	/jói no → íR no/	/jói deɕoR → íR deɕoR ~ jói | deɕóR → íR | deɕóR/	/jói joR → íR joR ~ jói | jóR → íR | jóR/	/jói deɕoR → íR deɕoR ~ jói | deɕóR → íR | deɕóR/ /jói ɾaɕiR → íR ɾaɕiR ~ jói | ɾaɕíR → íR | ɾaɕíR/	/joi ɾaɕíR → iR ɾaɕíR/	/jókaɾɯ ~ jokáɾɯ/	/jókaɾɯ beɕi̥ ~ jókaɾɯ | béɕi̥ ~ jokáɾɯ beɕi̥ ~ jokáɾɯ | béɕi̥ ~ jokaɾɯ béɕi̥/	/jókaɾɯ ɡotoɕi̥ ~ jókaɾɯ | ɡótoɕi̥ ~ jokáɾɯ ɡotoɕi̥ ~ jokáɾɯ | ɡótoɕi̥ ~ jokaɾɯ ɡótoɕi̥/
FA	‑i	nai (無い; 'is nonexistent')	/nái/	/nái no/	/nái deɕoR ~ nái | deɕóR/	/nái joR ~ nái | jóR/	/nái deɕoR ~ nái | deɕóR/ /nái ɾaɕiR ~ nái | ɾaɕíR/	/nai ɾaɕíR/	/nákaɾɯ ~ nakáɾɯ/	/nákaɾɯ beɕi̥ ~ nákaɾɯ | béɕi̥ ~ nakáɾɯ beɕi̥ ~ nakáɾɯ | béɕi̥ ~ nakaɾɯ béɕi̥/	/nákaɾɯ ɡotoɕi̥ ~ nákaɾɯ | ɡótoɕi̥ ~ nakáɾɯ ɡotoɕi̥ ~ nakáɾɯ | ɡótoɕi̥ ~ nakaɾɯ ɡótoɕi̥/
FA	‑i	chikai (近い; 'is near')	/cɕi̥kái/	/cɕi̥kái no/	/cɕi̥kái deɕoR ~ cɕi̥kái | deɕóR/	/cɕi̥kái joR ~ cɕi̥kái | jóR/	/cɕi̥kái deɕoR ~ cɕi̥kái | deɕóR/ /cɕi̥kái ɾaɕiR ~ cɕi̥kái | ɾaɕíR/	/cɕi̥kai ɾaɕíR/	/cɕí̥kakaɾɯ → cɕi̥kákaɾɯ ~ cɕi̥kakáɾɯ/	/cɕí̥kakaɾɯ beɕi̥ → cɕi̥kákaɾɯ beɕi̥ ~ cɕí̥kakaɾɯ | béɕi̥ → cɕi̥kákaɾɯ | béɕi̥ ~ cɕi̥kakáɾɯ beɕi̥ ~ cɕi̥kakáɾɯ | béɕi̥ ~ cɕi̥kakaɾɯ béɕi̥/	/cɕí̥kakaɾɯ ɡotoɕi̥ → cɕi̥kákaɾɯ ɡotoɕi̥ ~ cɕí̥kakaɾɯ | ɡótoɕi̥ → cɕi̥kákaɾɯ | ɡótoɕi̥ ~ cɕi̥kakáɾɯ ɡotoɕi̥ ~ cɕi̥kakáɾɯ | ɡótoɕi̥ ~ cɕi̥kakaɾɯ ɡótoɕi̥/
FA	‑i	aoi (青い; 'is blue')	/aói/	/aói no/	/aói deɕoR ~ aói | deɕóR/	/aói joR ~ aói | jóR/	/aói deɕoR ~ aói | deɕóR/ /aói ɾaɕiR ~ aói | ɾaɕíR/	/aoi ɾaɕíR/	/áokaɾɯ ~ aokáɾɯ/	/áokaɾɯ beɕi̥ ~ áokaɾɯ | béɕi̥ ~ aokáɾɯ beɕi̥ ~ aokáɾɯ | béɕi̥ ~ aokaɾɯ béɕi̥/	/áokaɾɯ ɡotoɕi̥ ~ áokaɾɯ | ɡótoɕi̥ ~ aokáɾɯ ɡotoɕi̥ ~ aokáɾɯ | ɡótoɕi̥ ~ aokaɾɯ ɡótoɕi̥/
FA	‑i	atsui (熱い; 'is hot')	/atsɯ́i/	/atsɯ́i no/	/atsɯ́i deɕoR ~ atsɯ́i | deɕóR/	/atsɯ́i joR ~ atsɯ́i | jóR/	/atsɯ́i deɕoR ~ atsɯ́i | deɕóR/ /atsɯ́i ɾaɕiR ~ atsɯ́i | ɾaɕíR/	/atsɯi ɾaɕíR/	/átsɯ̥kaɾɯ ~ atsɯ̥káɾɯ/	/átsɯ̥kaɾɯ beɕi̥ ~ átsɯ̥kaɾɯ | béɕi̥ ~ atsɯ̥káɾɯ beɕi̥ ~ atsɯ̥káɾɯ | béɕi̥ ~ atsɯ̥kaɾɯ béɕi̥/	/átsɯ̥kaɾɯ ɡotoɕi̥ ~ átsɯ̥kaɾɯ | ɡótoɕi̥ ~ atsɯ̥káɾɯ ɡotoɕi̥ ~ atsɯ̥káɾɯ | ɡótoɕi̥ ~ atsɯ̥kaɾɯ ɡótoɕi̥/
FA	‑i	kowai (怖い; 'is scary')	/kowái/	/kowái no/	/kowái deɕoR ~ kowái | deɕóR/	/kowái joR ~ kowái | jóR/	/kowái deɕoR ~ kowái | deɕóR/ /kowái ɾaɕiR ~ kowái | ɾaɕíR/	/kowai ɾaɕíR/	/kówakaɾɯ ~ kowakáɾɯ/	/kówakaɾɯ beɕi̥ ~ kówakaɾɯ | béɕi̥ ~ kowakáɾɯ beɕi̥ ~ kowakáɾɯ | béɕi̥ ~ kowakaɾɯ béɕi̥/	/kówakaɾɯ ɡotoɕi̥ ~ kówakaɾɯ | ɡótoɕi̥ ~ kowakáɾɯ ɡotoɕi̥ ~ kowakáɾɯ | ɡótoɕi̥ ~ kowakaɾɯ ɡótoɕi̥/
FA	‑i	ooi → ōi (多い; 'is abundant')	/oói → óRi/	/oói no → óRi no/	/oói deɕoR → óRi deɕoR ~ oói | deɕóR → óRi | deɕóR/	/oói joR → óRi joR ~ oói | jóR → óRi | jóR/	/oói deɕoR → óRi deɕoR ~ oói | deɕóR → óRi | deɕóR/ /oói ɾaɕiR → óRi ɾaɕiR ~ oói | ɾaɕíR → óRi | ɾaɕíR/	/oRi ɾaɕíR/	/óRkaɾɯ ~ oRkáɾɯ/	/óRkaɾɯ beɕi̥ ~ óRkaɾɯ | béɕi̥ ~ oRkáɾɯ beɕi̥ ~ oRkáɾɯ | béɕi̥ ~ oRkaɾɯ béɕi̥/	/óRkaɾɯ ɡotoɕi̥ ~ óRkaɾɯ | ɡótoɕi̥ ~ oRkáɾɯ ɡotoɕi̥ ~ oRkáɾɯ | ɡótoɕi̥ ~ oRkaɾɯ ɡótoɕi̥/
FA	‑i	mijikai (短い; 'is short')	/miʑikái/	/miʑikái no/	/miʑikái deɕoR ~ miʑikái | deɕóR/	/miʑikái joR ~ miʑikái | jóR/	/miʑikái deɕoR ~ miʑikái | deɕóR/ /miʑikái ɾaɕiR ~ miʑikái | ɾaɕíR/	/miʑikai ɾaɕíR/	/miʑíkakaɾɯ ~ miʑikákaɾɯ ~ miʑikakáɾɯ/	/miʑíkakaɾɯ beɕi̥ ~ miʑíkakaɾɯ | béɕi̥ ~ miʑikákaɾɯ beɕi̥ ~ miʑikákaɾɯ | béɕi̥ ~ miʑikakáɾɯ beɕi̥ ~ miʑikakáɾɯ | béɕi̥ ~ miʑikakaɾɯ béɕi̥/	/miʑíkakaɾɯ ɡotoɕi̥ ~ miʑíkakaɾɯ | ɡótoɕi̥ ~ miʑikákaɾɯ ɡotoɕi̥ ~ miʑikákaɾɯ | ɡótoɕi̥ ~ miʑikakáɾɯ ɡotoɕi̥ ~ miʑikakáɾɯ | ɡótoɕi̥ ~ miʑikakaɾɯ ɡótoɕi̥/
FA	‑i	chīsai (小さい; 'is small')	/cɕiRsái/	/cɕiRsái no/	/cɕiRsái deɕoR ~ cɕiRsái | deɕóR/	/cɕiRsái joR ~ cɕiRsái | jóR/	/cɕiRsái deɕoR ~ cɕiRsái | deɕóR/ /cɕiRsái ɾaɕiR ~ cɕiRsái | ɾaɕíR/	/cɕiRsai ɾaɕíR/	/cɕíRsakaɾɯ ~ cɕiRsákaɾɯ ~ cɕiRsakáɾɯ/	/cɕíRsakaɾɯ beɕi̥ ~ cɕíRsakaɾɯ | béɕi̥ ~ cɕiRsákaɾɯ beɕi̥ ~ cɕiRsákaɾɯ | béɕi̥ ~ cɕiRsakáɾɯ beɕi̥ ~ cɕiRsakáɾɯ | béɕi̥ ~ cɕiRsakaɾɯ béɕi̥/	/cɕíRsakaɾɯ ɡotoɕi̥ ~ cɕíRsakaɾɯ | ɡótoɕi̥ ~ cɕiRsákaɾɯ ɡotoɕi̥ ~ cɕiRsákaɾɯ | ɡótoɕi̥ ~ cɕiRsakáɾɯ ɡotoɕi̥ ~ cɕiRsakáɾɯ | ɡótoɕi̥ ~ cɕiRsakaɾɯ ɡótoɕi̥/
FA	‑i	ōkī (大きい; 'is large')	/oRkíR/	/oRkíR no/	/oRkíR deɕoR ~ oRkíR | deɕóR/	/oRkíR joR ~ oRkíR | jóR/	/oRkíR deɕoR ~ oRkíR | deɕóR/ /oRkíR ɾaɕiR ~ oRkíR | ɾaɕíR/	/oRkiR ɾaɕíR/	/óRki̥kaɾɯ ~ oRkí̥kaɾɯ ~ oRki̥káɾɯ/	/óRki̥kaɾɯ beɕi̥ ~ óRki̥kaɾɯ | béɕi̥ ~ oRkí̥kaɾɯ beɕi̥ ~ oRkí̥kaɾɯ | béɕi̥ ~ oRki̥káɾɯ beɕi̥ ~ oRki̥káɾɯ | béɕi̥ ~ oRki̥kaɾɯ béɕi̥/	/óRki̥kaɾɯ ɡotoɕi̥ ~ óRki̥kaɾɯ | ɡótoɕi̥ ~ oRkí̥kaɾɯ ɡotoɕi̥ ~ oRkí̥kaɾɯ | ɡótoɕi̥ ~ oRki̥káɾɯ ɡotoɕi̥ ~ oRki̥káɾɯ | ɡótoɕi̥ ~ oRki̥kaɾɯ ɡótoɕi̥/
FA	‑i	isagiyoi (潔い; 'is honorable')	/isaɡijói/	/isaɡijói no/	/isaɡijói deɕoR ~ isaɡijói | deɕóR/	/isaɡijói joR ~ isaɡijói | jóR/	/isaɡijói deɕoR ~ isaɡijói | deɕóR/ /isaɡijói ɾaɕiR ~ isaɡijói | ɾaɕíR/	/isaɡijoi ɾaɕíR/	/isaɡijókaɾɯ ~ isaɡijokáɾɯ/	/isaɡijókaɾɯ beɕi̥ ~ isaɡijókaɾɯ | béɕi̥ ~ isaɡijokáɾɯ beɕi̥ ~ isaɡijokáɾɯ | béɕi̥ ~ isaɡijokaɾɯ béɕi̥/	/isaɡijókaɾɯ ɡotoɕi̥ ~ isaɡijókaɾɯ | ɡótoɕi̥ ~ isaɡijokáɾɯ ɡotoɕi̥ ~ isaɡijokáɾɯ | ɡótoɕi̥ ~ isaɡijokaɾɯ ɡótoɕi̥/
FA	‑i	‑tai (たい; 'wants to')	/itái/	/itái no/	/itái deɕoR ~ itái | deɕóR/	/itái joR ~ itái | jóR/	/itái deɕoR ~ itái | deɕóR/ /itái ɾaɕiR ~ itái | ɾaɕíR/	/itai ɾaɕíR/	/ítakaɾɯ ~ itákaɾɯ ~ itakáɾɯ/	/ítakaɾɯ beɕi̥ ~ ítakaɾɯ | béɕi̥ ~ itákaɾɯ beɕi̥ ~ itákaɾɯ | béɕi̥ ~ itakáɾɯ beɕi̥ ~ itakáɾɯ | béɕi̥ ~ itakaɾɯ béɕi̥/	/ítakaɾɯ ɡotoɕi̥ ~ ítakaɾɯ | ɡótoɕi̥ ~ itákaɾɯ ɡotoɕi̥ ~ itákaɾɯ | ɡótoɕi̥ ~ itakáɾɯ ɡotoɕi̥ ~ itakáɾɯ | ɡótoɕi̥ ~ itakaɾɯ ɡótoɕi̥/
FA	‑i	‑nai (ない; 'not')	/ínai/	/ínai no/	/ínai deɕoR ~ ínai | deɕóR/	/ínai joR ~ ínai | jóR/	/ínai deɕoR ~ ínai | deɕóR/ /ínai ɾaɕiR ~ ínai | ɾaɕíR/	/inai ɾaɕíR/	/ínakaɾɯ ~ inakáɾɯ/	/ínakaɾɯ beɕi̥ ~ ínakaɾɯ | béɕi̥ ~ inakáɾɯ beɕi̥ ~ inakáɾɯ | béɕi̥ ~ inakaɾɯ béɕi̥/	/ínakaɾɯ ɡotoɕi̥ ~ ínakaɾɯ | ɡótoɕi̥ ~ inakáɾɯ ɡotoɕi̥ ~ inakáɾɯ | ɡótoɕi̥ ~ inakaɾɯ ɡótoɕi̥/
FA	‑shī	oshī (惜しい; 'is unfortunate')	/oɕíR/	/oɕíR no/	/oɕíR deɕoR ~ oɕíR | deɕóR/	/oɕíR joR ~ oɕíR | jóR/	/oɕíR deɕoR ~ oɕíR | deɕóR/ /oɕíR ɾaɕiR ~ oɕíR | ɾaɕíR/	/oɕiR ɾaɕíR/	/óɕi̥kaɾɯ ~ oɕi̥káɾɯ/	/óɕi̥kaɾɯ beɕi̥ ~ óɕi̥kaɾɯ | béɕi̥ ~ oɕi̥káɾɯ beɕi̥ ~ oɕi̥káɾɯ | béɕi̥ ~ oɕi̥kaɾɯ béɕi̥/	/óɕi̥kaɾɯ ɡotoɕi̥ ~ óɕi̥kaɾɯ | ɡótoɕi̥ ~ oɕi̥káɾɯ ɡotoɕi̥ ~ oɕi̥káɾɯ | ɡótoɕi̥ ~ oɕi̥kaɾɯ ɡótoɕi̥/
FA	‑shī	ooshī (雄々しい; 'is manly')	/ooɕíR/	/ooɕíR no/	/ooɕíR deɕoR ~ ooɕíR | deɕóR/	/ooɕíR joR ~ ooɕíR | jóR/	/ooɕíR deɕoR ~ ooɕíR | deɕóR/ /ooɕíR ɾaɕiR ~ ooɕíR | ɾaɕíR/	/ooɕiR ɾaɕíR/	/oóɕi̥kaɾɯ ~ ooɕi̥káɾɯ/	/oóɕi̥kaɾɯ beɕi̥ ~ oóɕi̥kaɾɯ | béɕi̥ ~ ooɕi̥káɾɯ beɕi̥ ~ ooɕi̥káɾɯ | béɕi̥ ~ ooɕi̥kaɾɯ béɕi̥/	/oóɕi̥kaɾɯ ɡotoɕi̥ ~ oóɕi̥kaɾɯ | ɡótoɕi̥ ~ ooɕi̥káɾɯ ɡotoɕi̥ ~ ooɕi̥káɾɯ | ɡótoɕi̥ ~ ooɕi̥kaɾɯ ɡótoɕi̥/
FA	‑shī	ureshī (嬉しい; 'is joyful')	/ɯɾeɕíR/	/ɯɾeɕíR no/	/ɯɾeɕíR deɕoR ~ ɯɾeɕíR | deɕóR/	/ɯɾeɕíR joR ~ ɯɾeɕíR | jóR/	/ɯɾeɕíR deɕoR ~ ɯɾeɕíR | deɕóR/ /ɯɾeɕíR ɾaɕiR ~ ɯɾeɕíR | ɾaɕíR/	/ɯɾeɕiR ɾaɕíR/	/ɯɾéɕi̥kaɾɯ ~ ɯɾeɕi̥káɾɯ/	/ɯɾéɕi̥kaɾɯ beɕi̥ ~ ɯɾéɕi̥kaɾɯ | béɕi̥ ~ ɯɾeɕi̥káɾɯ beɕi̥ ~ ɯɾeɕi̥káɾɯ | béɕi̥ ~ ɯɾeɕi̥kaɾɯ béɕi̥/	/ɯɾéɕi̥kaɾɯ ɡotoɕi̥ ~ ɯɾéɕi̥kaɾɯ | ɡótoɕi̥ ~ ɯɾeɕi̥káɾɯ ɡotoɕi̥ ~ ɯɾeɕi̥káɾɯ | ɡótoɕi̥ ~ ɯɾeɕi̥kaɾɯ ɡótoɕi̥/
FA	‑shī	onajī (同じい; 'is alike')	/onaʑíR/	/onaʑíR no/	/onaʑíR deɕoR ~ onaʑíR | deɕóR/	/onaʑíR joR ~ onaʑíR | jóR/	/onaʑíR deɕoR ~ onaʑíR | deɕóR/ /onaʑíR ɾaɕiR ~ onaʑíR | ɾaɕíR/	/onaʑiR ɾaɕíR/	/onáʑikaɾɯ ~ onaʑikáɾɯ/	/onáʑikaɾɯ beɕi̥ ~ onáʑikaɾɯ | béɕi̥ ~ onaʑikáɾɯ beɕi̥ ~ onaʑikáɾɯ | béɕi̥ ~ onaʑikaɾɯ béɕi̥/	/onáʑikaɾɯ ɡotoɕi̥ ~ onáʑikaɾɯ | ɡótoɕi̥ ~ onaʑikáɾɯ ɡotoɕi̥ ~ onaʑikáɾɯ | ɡótoɕi̥ ~ onaʑikaɾɯ ɡótoɕi̥/
FA	‑shī	rashī (らしい; 'is as if')	/íɾɯ ɾaɕiR ~ íɾɯ | ɾaɕíR ~ iɾɯ ɾaɕíR/	/íɾɯ ɾaɕiR no ~ íɾɯ | ɾaɕíR no ~ iɾɯ ɾaɕíR no/	/íɾɯ ɾaɕiR deɕoR ~ íɾɯ | ɾaɕíR deɕoR ~ íɾɯ ɾaɕiR | deɕóR ~ íɾɯ | ɾaɕíR | deɕóR ~ iɾɯ ɾaɕíR deɕoR ~ iɾɯ ɾaɕíR | deɕóR/	/íɾɯ ɾaɕiR joR ~ íɾɯ | ɾaɕíR joR ~ íɾɯ ɾaɕíR | jóR ~ íɾɯ | ɾaɕíR | jóR ~ iɾɯ ɾaɕíR joR ~ iɾɯ ɾaɕíR | jóR/	/íɾɯ ɾaɕiR deɕoR ~ íɾɯ | ɾaɕíR deɕoR ~ íɾɯ ɾaɕiR | deɕóR ~ íɾɯ | ɾaɕíR | deɕóR ~ iɾɯ ɾaɕíR deɕoR ~ iɾɯ ɾaɕíR | deɕóR/		/íɾɯ ɾaɕi̥kaɾɯ ~ íɾɯ | ɾáɕi̥kaɾɯ ~ íɾɯ | ɾaɕi̥káɾɯ ~ iɾɯ ɾáɕi̥kaɾɯ ~ iɾɯ ɾaɕi̥káɾɯ/	/íɾɯ ɾaɕi̥kaɾɯ beɕi̥ ~ íɾɯ | ɾáɕi̥kaɾɯ beɕi̥ ~ íɾɯ | ɾaɕi̥káɾɯ beɕi̥ ~ íɾɯ ɾaɕi̥kaɾɯ | béɕi̥ ~ íɾɯ | ɾáɕi̥kaɾɯ | béɕi̥ ~ íɾɯ | ɾaɕi̥káɾɯ | béɕi̥ ~ iɾɯ ɾáɕi̥kaɾɯ beɕi̥ ~ iɾɯ ɾáɕi̥kaɾɯ | béɕi̥ ~ iɾɯ ɾaɕi̥káɾɯ beɕi̥ ~ iɾɯ ɾaɕi̥káɾɯ | béɕi̥ ~ iɾɯ ɾaɕi̥kaɾɯ béɕi̥/	/íɾɯ ɾaɕi̥kaɾɯ ɡotoɕi̥ ~ íɾɯ | ɾáɕi̥kaɾɯ ɡotoɕi̥ ~ íɾɯ | ɾaɕi̥káɾɯ ɡotoɕi̥ ~ íɾɯ ɾaɕi̥kaɾɯ | ɡótoɕi̥ ~ íɾɯ | ɾáɕi̥kaɾɯ | ɡótoɕi̥ ~ íɾɯ | ɾaɕi̥káɾɯ | ɡótoɕi̥ ~ iɾɯ ɾáɕi̥kaɾɯ ɡotoɕi̥ ~ iɾɯ ɾáɕi̥kaɾɯ | ɡótoɕi̥ ~ iɾɯ ɾaɕi̥káɾɯ ɡotoɕi̥ ~ iɾɯ ɾaɕi̥káɾɯ | ɡótoɕi̥ ~ iɾɯ ɾaɕi̥kaɾɯ ɡótoɕi̥/

==== Adjectival infinitive + particle ====
There is only one group of particles following infinitives:

- Recessive and accenting the mora before the infinitive /k/: te (gerund) / te wa (ては) / cha(a) / te mo / tari / tara(ba), wa (は), mo

Adjective type			Base infinitive	Base gerund	Classical aru-supported infinitive	Modern aru-supported gerund (Note: See Japanese conjugation (ren'yōkei base) § Gerund for more.)
PA	‑ku	akaku (赤く; 'being red')	/akakɯ/	/akákɯ̥te/	/akákaɾi ~ akakáɾi/	/akákaQte/
PA	‑ku	atsuku (厚く; 'being thick')	/atsɯ̥kɯ/	/atsɯ́kɯ̥te/	/atsɯ̥́kaɾi ~ atsɯ̥káɾi/	/atsɯ̥́kaQte/
PA	‑ku	tōku (遠く; 'being far')	/toRkɯ/	/toókɯ̥te → tóRkɯ̥te/	/toókaɾi → tóRkaɾi ~ toRkáɾi/	/toókaQte → tóRkaQte/
PA	‑ku	tsɯmetaku (冷たく; 'being chilly')	/tsɯmetakɯ/	/tsɯmetákɯ̥te/	/tsɯmetákaɾi ~ tsɯmetakáɾi/	/tsɯmetákaQte/
PA	‑ku	‑taku (たく; 'wanting to')	/itakɯ ~ itákɯ, ítakɯ/	/itákɯ̥te, ítakɯ̥te/	/itákaɾi ~ ítakaɾi ~ itakáɾi/	/itákaQte/
PA	‑ku	‑naku (なく; 'not')	/inakɯ/	/inái de/ /inákɯ̥te/		/inákaQte/
PA	‑shiku	yasashiku (優しく; 'being gentle')	/jasaɕi̥kɯ/	/jasaɕíkɯ̥te → jasáɕi̥kɯ̥te/	/jasaɕí̥kaɾi → jasáɕi̥kaɾi ~ jasaɕi̥káɾi/	/jasaɕí̥kaQte → jasáɕi̥kaQte/
PA	‑shiku	onajiku (同じく; 'being alike')	/onaʑikɯ/	/onaʑíkɯ̥te/	/onaʑíkaɾi ~ onaʑikáɾi/	/onaʑíkaQte/
FA	‑ku	yoku (良く; 'being good')	/jókɯ/	/jókɯ̥te/	/jókaɾi ~ jokáɾi/	/jókaQte/
FA	‑ku	naku (無く; 'being nonexistent')	/nákɯ/	/nákɯ̥te/	/nákaɾi ~ nakáɾi/	/nákaQte/
FA	‑ku	chikaku (近く; 'being near')	/cɕí̥kakɯ → cɕi̥kákɯ/	/cɕí̥kakɯ̥te → cɕi̥kákɯ̥te/	/cɕí̥kakaɾi → cɕi̥kákaɾi ~ cɕi̥kakáɾi/	/cɕí̥kakaQte → cɕi̥kákaQte/
FA	‑ku	aoku (青く; 'being blue')	/áokɯ ~ aókɯ/	/áokɯ̥te ~ aókɯ̥te/	/áokaɾi ~ aokáɾi/	/áokaQte ~ aókaQte/
FA	‑ku	atsuku (熱く; 'being hot')	/átsɯ̥kɯ ~ atsɯ̥́kɯ/	/átsɯ̥kɯ̥te ~ atsɯ́kɯ̥te/	/átsɯ̥kaɾi ~ atsɯ̥káɾi/	/átsɯ̥kaQte ~ atsɯ̥́kaQte/
FA	‑ku	kowaku (怖く; 'being scary')	/kówakɯ ~ kowákɯ/	/kówakɯ̥te ~ kowákɯ̥te/	/kówakaɾi ~ kowakáɾi/	/kówakaQte ~ kowákaQte/
FA	‑ku	ōku ~ ooku (多く; 'being abundant')	/óRkɯ ~ oókɯ/	/óRkɯ̥te ~ oókɯ̥te/	/óRkaɾi ~ oRkáɾi/	/óRkaQte ~ oókaQte/
FA	‑ku	mijikaku (短く; 'being short')	/miʑíkakɯ ~ miʑikákɯ/	/miʑíkakɯ̥te ~ miʑikákɯ̥te/	/miʑíkakaɾi ~ miʑikákaɾi ~ miʑikakáɾi/	/miʑíkakaQte ~ miʑikákaQte/
FA	‑ku	chīsaku (小さく; 'being small')	/cɕíRsakɯ ~ cɕiRsákɯ/	/cɕíRsakɯ̥te ~ cɕiRsákɯ̥te/	/cɕíRsakaɾi ~ cɕiRsákaɾi ~ cɕiRsakáɾi/	/cɕíRsakaQte ~ cɕiRsákaQte/
FA	‑ku	ōkiku (大きく; 'being large')	/óRki̥kɯ ~ oRkí̥kɯ/	/óRki̥kɯ̥te ~ oRkíkɯ̥te/		/óRki̥kaQte ~ oRkí̥kaQte/
FA	‑ku	isagiyoku (潔く; 'being honorable')	/isaɡíjokɯ ~ isaɡijókɯ/	/isaɡíjokɯ̥te ~ isaɡijókɯ̥te/	/isaɡijókaɾi ~ isaɡijokáɾi/	/isaɡíjokaQte ~ isaɡijókaQte/
FA	‑ku	beku (可く; 'needing to')	/íɾɯ bekɯ ~ íɾɯ | békɯ ~ iɾɯ békɯ/	/íɾɯ bekɯ̥te ~ íɾɯ | békɯ̥te ~ iɾɯ békɯ̥te/	/íɾɯ bekaɾi ~ íɾɯ | békaɾi ~ íɾɯ | bekáɾi ~ iɾɯ békaɾi ~ iɾɯ bekáɾi/	
FA	‑ku	gotoku (如く; 'being as if')	/íɾɯ ɡotokɯ ~ íɾɯ | ɡótokɯ ~ iɾɯ ɡótokɯ/	/íɾɯ ɡotokɯ̥te ~ íɾɯ | ɡótokɯ̥te ~ iɾɯ ɡótokɯ̥te/	/íɾɯ ɡotokaɾi ~ íɾɯ | ɡótokaɾi ~ íɾɯ | ɡotokáɾi ~ iɾɯ ɡótokaɾi ~ iɾɯ ɡotokáɾi/	
FA	‑ku	‑taku (たく; 'wanting to')	/itákɯ, ítakɯ/	/itákɯ̥te, ítakɯ̥te/	/ítakaɾi ~ itákaɾi ~ itakáɾi/	/itákaQte/
FA	‑ku	‑naku (なく; 'not')	/ínakɯ/	/ínai de/ /ínakɯ̥te/		/ínakaQte/
FA	‑shiku	oshiku (惜しく; 'being unfortunate')	/óɕi̥kɯ ~ oɕí̥kɯ/	/óɕi̥kɯ̥te ~ oɕíkɯ̥te/	/óɕi̥kaɾi ~ oɕi̥káɾi/	/óɕi̥kaQte ~ oɕí̥kaQte/
FA	‑shiku	ooshiku (雄々しく; 'being manly')	/oóɕi̥kɯ ~ ooɕí̥kɯ/	/oóɕi̥kɯ̥te ~ ooɕíkɯ̥te/	/oóɕi̥kaɾi ~ ooɕi̥káɾi/	/oóɕi̥kaQte ~ ooɕí̥kaQte/
FA	‑shiku	ureshiku (嬉しく; 'being joyful')	/ɯɾéɕi̥kɯ ~ ɯɾeɕí̥kɯ/	/ɯɾéɕi̥kɯ̥te ~ ɯɾeɕíkɯ̥te/	/ɯɾéɕi̥kaɾi ~ ɯɾeɕi̥káɾi/	/ɯɾéɕi̥kaQte ~ ɯɾeɕí̥kaQte/
FA	‑shiku	onajiku (同じく; 'being alike')	/onáʑikɯ ~ onaʑíkɯ/	/onáʑikɯ̥te ~ onaʑíkɯ̥te/	/onáʑikaɾi ~ onaʑikáɾi/	/onáʑikaQte ~ onaʑíkaQte/
FA	‑shiku	rashiku (らしく; 'being likely (to)')	/íɾɯ ɾaɕi̥kɯ ~ íɾɯ | ɾáɕi̥kɯ ~ iɾɯ ɾáɕi̥kɯ/	/íɾɯ ɾaɕi̥kɯ̥te ~ íɾɯ | ɾáɕi̥kɯ̥te ~ iɾɯ ɾáɕi̥kɯ̥te/	/íɾɯ ɾaɕi̥kaɾi ~ íɾɯ | ɾáɕi̥kaɾi ~ íɾɯ | ɾaɕi̥káɾi ~ iɾɯ ɾáɕi̥kaɾi ~ iɾɯ ɾaɕi̥káɾi/	/íɾɯ ɾaɕi̥kaQte ~ íɾɯ | ɾáɕi̥kaQte ~ iɾɯ ɾáɕi̥kaQte/
FA	‑shiku	majiku (まじく; 'not needing to')	/íɾɯ maʑikɯ ~ íɾɯ | máʑikɯ ~ iɾɯ máʑikɯ/	/íɾɯ maʑikɯ̥te ~ íɾɯ | máʑikɯ̥te ~ iɾɯ máʑikɯ̥te/	/íɾɯ maʑikaɾi ~ íɾɯ | máʑikaɾi ~ íɾɯ | maʑikáɾi ~ iɾɯ máʑikaɾi ~ iɾɯ maʑikáɾi/	

==== Adjectival infinitive + auxiliary ====
The base infinitive is a free word, which means when it is followed by a verb like naru (為る; /náɾɯ/ 'becomes') or an adjective like nai (無い; /nái/ 'is nonexistent'; negates adjectives), it combines with those words normally as shown in Japanese pitch accent § Combining minor phrases.

As for the aru-supported infinitive, there is only one group of auxiliaries following it:

- Recessive and accenting the mora before the infinitive /k/:
  - Modern: ta (perfect conclusive/attributive) / tarō
  - Pseudo-classical: taru

For ‑ta 'rō as the contraction of ‑ta darō, see #‑tarō/‑darō vs ‑ta 'rō/‑da 'rō.

Adjective type			Classical aru-supported infinitive	Modern perfect conclusive/attributive
PA	‑kari	akakari (赤かり)	/akákaɾi ~ akakáɾi/	/akákaQta/
PA	‑kari	atsukari (厚かり)	/atsɯ̥́kaɾi ~ atsɯ̥káɾi/	/atsɯ̥́kaQta/
PA	‑kari	tōkari (遠かり)	/toókaɾi → tóRkaɾi ~ toRkáɾi/	/toókaQta → tóRkaQta/
PA	‑kari	tsɯmetakari (冷たかり)	/tsɯmetákaɾi ~ tsɯmetakáɾi/	/tsɯmetákaQta/
PA	‑kari	‑takari (たかり)	/itákaɾi ~ ítakaɾi ~ itakáɾi/	/itákaQta/
PA	‑kari	‑nakat‑ (なかっ)		/inákaQta/
PA	‑shikari	yasashikari (優しかり)	/jasaɕí̥kaɾi → jasáɕi̥kaɾi ~ jasaɕi̥káɾi/	/jasaɕí̥kaQta → jasáɕi̥kaQta/
PA	‑shikari	onajikari (同じかり)	/onaʑíkaɾi ~ onaʑikáɾi/	/onaʑíkaQta/
FA	‑kari	yokari (良かり)	/jókaɾi ~ jokáɾi/	/jókaQta/
FA	‑kari	nakari (無かり)	/nákaɾi ~ nakáɾi/	/nákaQta/
FA	‑kari	chikakari (近かり)	/cɕí̥kakaɾi → cɕi̥kákaɾi ~ cɕi̥kakáɾi/	/cɕí̥kakaQta → cɕi̥kákaQta/
FA	‑kari	aokari (青かり)	/áokaɾi ~ aokáɾi/	/áokaQta ~ aókaQta/
FA	‑kari	atsukari (熱かり)	/átsɯ̥kaɾi ~ atsɯ̥káɾi/	/átsɯ̥kaQta ~ atsɯ̥́kaQta/
FA	‑kari	kowakari (怖かり)	/kówakaɾi ~ kowakáɾi/	/kówakaQta ~ kowákaQta/
FA	‑kari	ōkari (多かり)	/óRkaɾi ~ oRkáɾi/	/óRkaQta ~ oókaQta/
FA	‑kari	mijikakari (短かり)	/miʑíkakaɾi ~ miʑikákaɾi ~ miʑikakáɾi/	/miʑíkakaQta ~ miʑikákaQta/
FA	‑kari	chīsakari (小さかり)	/cɕíRsakaɾi ~ cɕiRsákaɾi ~ cɕiRsakáɾi/	/cɕíRsakaQta ~ cɕiRsákaQta/
FA	‑kari	ōkikat‑ (大きかっ)		/óRki̥kaQta ~ oRkí̥kaQta/
FA	‑kari	isagiyokari (潔かり)	/isaɡijókaɾi ~ isaɡijokáɾi/	/isaɡíjokaQta ~ isaɡijókaQta/
FA	‑kari	‑takari (たかり)	/ítakaɾi ~ itákaɾi ~ itakáɾi/	/itákaQta/
FA	‑kari	‑nakat‑ (なかっ)		/ínakaQta/
FA	‑shikari	oshikari (惜しかり)	/óɕi̥kaɾi ~ oɕi̥káɾi/	/óɕi̥kaQta ~ oɕí̥kaQta/
FA	‑shikari	ooshikari (雄々しかり)	/oóɕi̥kaɾi ~ ooɕi̥káɾi/	/oóɕi̥kaQta ~ ooɕí̥kaQta/
FA	‑shikari	ureshikari (嬉しかり)	/ɯɾéɕi̥kaɾi ~ ɯɾeɕi̥káɾi/	/ɯɾéɕi̥kaQta ~ ɯɾeɕí̥kaQta/
FA	‑shikari	onajikari (同じかり)	/onáʑikaɾi ~ onaʑikáɾi/	/onáʑikaQta ~ onaʑíkaQta/
FA	‑shikari	rashikari (らしかり)	/íɾɯ ɾaɕi̥kaɾi ~ íɾɯ | ɾáɕi̥kaɾi ~ íɾɯ | ɾaɕi̥káɾi ~ iɾɯ ɾáɕi̥kaɾi ~ iɾɯ ɾaɕi̥káɾi/	/íɾɯ ɾaɕi̥kaQta ~ íɾɯ | ɾáɕi̥kaQta ~ iɾɯ ɾáɕi̥kaQta/

==== Adjectival stem + auxiliary ====
There is only one auxiliary following adjectival stems (語幹, gokan), sō (da) ("seems"). It otherwise follows verbal infinitives, and it is not to be confused with sō (da) ("it's said") which follows verbal and adjectival attributives.

- Type-preserving, and unaccented or initial-accented: sō (da)

Adjective type		sō
PA	aka‑ (赤; 'red')	/akasoR/
PA	atsu‑ (厚; 'thick')	/atsɯ̥soR/
PA	tō‑ (遠; 'far')	/toRsoR/
PA	tsɯmeta‑ (冷た; 'chilly')	/tsɯmetasoR/
PA	‑ta‑ (た; 'to want to')	/itasoR/
PA	‑na‑ (な; 'not')	/inasoR/
‑shi‑	yasashi‑ (優し; 'gentle')	/jasaɕi̥soR/
‑shi‑	onaji‑ (同じ; 'alike')	/onaʑisoR/
FA	yo‑ (良; 'good')	/josóR/
FA	na‑ (無; 'nonexistent')	/nasóR/
FA	chika‑ (近; 'near')	/cɕi̥kasóR/
FA	ao‑ (青; 'blue')	/aosóR/
FA	atsu‑ (熱; 'hot')	/atsɯ̥sóR/
FA	kowa‑ (怖; 'scary')	/kowasóR/
FA	ō‑ (多; 'abundant')	/oRsóR/
FA	mijika‑ (短; 'short')	/miʑikasóR/
FA	chīsa‑ (小さ; 'small')	/cɕiRsasóR/
FA	ōki‑ (大き; 'large')	/oRki̥sóR/
FA	isagiyo‑ (潔; 'honorable')	/isaɡijosóR/
FA	‑ta‑ (た; 'to want to')	/itasóR/
FA	‑na‑ (な; 'not')	/inasóR/
‑shi‑	oshi‑ (惜し; 'unfortunate')	/oɕi̥sóR/
‑shi‑	ooshi‑ (雄々し; 'manly')	/ooɕi̥sóR/
‑shi‑	ureshi‑ (嬉し; 'joyful')	/ɯɾeɕi̥sóR/
‑shi‑	onaji‑ (同じ; 'alike')	/onaʑisóR/
‑shi‑	rashi‑ (らし; 'likely (to)')	/íɾɯ ɾaɕi̥soR ~ íɾɯ | ɾaɕi̥sóR ~ iɾɯ ɾaɕi̥sóR/

==== Adjectival provisional, classical adjectival concessive and classical adjectival hypothetical ====
The base provisional and classical base concessive (see Japanese conjugation § Conditional) are based on the kateikei/izenkei (仮定形・已然形; lit. 'hypothetical form/realis form'), which is a bound morpheme and must combine with the following particles. The classical base hypothetical (see Japanese conjugation § Provisional vs hypothetical) behaves accentually similarly to the provisional, except it is based on the base infinitive.

- Recessive and accenting the mora before /k/: ba (provisional and classical hypothetical), do (mo) (classical concessive)

Adjective type			Base provisional	Classical base concessive	Base infinitive	Classical base hypothetical
PA	‑kere‑ ‑ku	akakere‑ (赤けれ) akaku (赤く; 'being red')	/akákeɾeba/	/akákeɾedo/	/akakɯ/	/akákɯ(N)ba/
PA	‑kere‑ ‑ku	atsukere‑ (厚けれ) atsuku (厚く; 'being thick')	/atsɯ̥́keɾeba/	/atsɯ̥́keɾedo/	/atsɯ̥kɯ/	/atsɯ̥́kɯ(N)ba/
PA	‑kere‑ ‑ku	tōkere‑ (遠けれ) tōku (遠く; 'being far')	/toókeɾeba → tóRkeɾeba/	/toókeɾedo → tóRkeɾedo/	/toRkɯ/	/toókɯ(N)ba → tóRkɯ(N)ba/
PA	‑kere‑ ‑ku	tsɯmetakere‑ (冷たけれ) tsɯmetaku (冷たく; 'being chilly')	/tsɯmetákeɾeba/	/tsɯmetákeɾedo/	/tsɯmetakɯ/	/tsɯmetákɯ(N)ba/
PA	‑kere‑ ‑ku	‑takere‑ (たけれ) ‑taku (たく; 'wanting to')	/itákeɾeba, ítakeɾeba/	/itákeɾedo ~ ítakeɾedo/	/itakɯ ~ itákɯ, ítakɯ/	/itákɯ(N)ba ~ ítakɯ(N)ba/
PA	‑kere‑ ‑ku	‑nakere‑ (なけれ) ‑naku (なく; 'not')	/inákeɾeba/		/inakɯ/	
PA	‑shikere‑ ‑shiku	yasashikere‑ (優しけれ) yasashiku (優しく; 'being gentle')	/jasaɕí̥keɾeba → jasáɕi̥keɾeba/	/jasaɕí̥keɾedo → jasáɕi̥keɾedo/	/jasaɕi̥kɯ/	/jasaɕí̥kɯ(N)ba → jasáɕi̥kɯ(N)ba/
PA	‑shikere‑ ‑shiku	onajikere‑ (同じけれ) onajiku (同じく; 'being alike')	/onaʑíkeɾeba/	/onaʑíkeɾedo/	/onaʑikɯ/	/onaʑíkɯ(N)ba/
FA	‑kere‑ ‑ku	yokere‑ (良けれ) yoku (良く; 'being good')	/jókeɾeba/	/jókeɾedo/	/jókɯ/	/jókɯ(N)ba/
FA	‑kere‑ ‑ku	nakere‑ (無けれ) naku (無く; 'being nonexistent')	/nákeɾeba/	/nákeɾedo/	/nákɯ/	/nákɯ(N)ba/
FA	‑kere‑ ‑ku	chikakere‑ (近けれ) chikaku (近く; 'being near')	/cɕí̥kakeɾeba → cɕi̥kákeɾeba/	/cɕí̥kakeɾedo → cɕi̥kákeɾedo/	/cɕí̥kakɯ → cɕi̥kákɯ/	/cɕí̥kakɯ(N)ba → cɕi̥kákɯ(N)ba/
FA	‑kere‑ ‑ku	aokere‑ (青けれ) aoku (青く; 'being blue')	/áokeɾeba ~ aókeɾeba/	/áokeɾedo/	/áokɯ ~ aókɯ/	/áokɯ(N)ba/
FA	‑kere‑ ‑ku	atsukere‑ (熱けれ) atsuku (熱く; 'being hot')	/átsɯ̥keɾeba ~ atsɯ̥́keɾeba/	/átsɯ̥keɾedo/	/átsɯ̥kɯ ~ atsɯ̥́kɯ/	/átsɯ̥kɯ(N)ba/
FA	‑kere‑ ‑ku	kowakere‑ (怖けれ) kowaku (怖く; 'being scary')	/kówakeɾeba ~ kowákeɾeba/	/kówakeɾedo/	/kówakɯ ~ kowákɯ/	/kówakɯ(N)ba/
FA	‑kere‑ ‑ku	ōkere‑ ~ ookere‑ (多けれ) ōku ~ ooku (多く; 'being abundant')	/óRkeɾeba ~ oókeɾeba/	/óRkeɾedo/	/óRkɯ ~ oókɯ/	/óRkɯ(N)ba/
FA	‑kere‑ ‑ku	mijikakere‑ (短けれ) mijikaku (短く; 'being short')	/miʑíkakeɾeba ~ miʑikákeɾeba/	/miʑíkakeɾedo ~ miʑikákeɾedo/	/miʑíkakɯ ~ miʑikákɯ/	/miʑíkakɯ(N)ba ~ miʑikákɯ(N)ba/
FA	‑kere‑ ‑ku	chīsakere‑ (小さけれ) chīsaku (小さく; 'being small')	/cɕíRsakeɾeba ~ cɕiRsákeɾeba/	/cɕíRsakeɾedo ~ cɕiRsákeɾedo/	/cɕíRsakɯ ~ cɕiRsákɯ/	/cɕíRsakɯ(N)ba ~ cɕiRsákɯ(N)ba/
FA	‑kere‑ ‑ku	ōkikere‑ (大きけれ) ōkiku (大きく; 'being large')	/óRki̥keɾeba ~ oRkí̥keɾeba/		/óRki̥kɯ ~ oRkí̥kɯ/	
FA	‑kere‑ ‑ku	isagiyokere‑ (潔けれ) isagiyoku (潔く; 'being honorable')	/isaɡíjokeɾeba ~ isaɡijókeɾeba/	/isaɡijókeɾedo/	/isaɡíjokɯ ~ isaɡijókɯ/	/isaɡijókɯ(N)ba/
FA	‑kere‑ ‑ku	bekere‑ (可けれ) beku (可く; 'needing to')	/íɾɯ bekeɾeba ~ íɾɯ | békeɾeba ~ iɾɯ békeɾeba/	/íɾɯ bekeɾedo ~ íɾɯ | békeɾedo ~ iɾɯ békeɾedo/	/íɾɯ bekɯ ~ íɾɯ | békɯ ~ iɾɯ békɯ/	/íɾɯ bekɯ(N)ba ~ íɾɯ | békɯ(N)ba ~ iɾɯ békɯ(N)ba/
FA	‑kere‑ ‑ku	‑takere‑ (たけれ) ‑taku (たく; 'wanting to')	/itákeɾeba, ítakeɾeba/	/ítakeɾedo ~ itákeɾedo/	/itákɯ, ítakɯ/	/ítakɯ(N)ba ~ itákɯ(N)ba/
FA	‑kere‑ ‑ku	‑nakere‑ (なけれ) ‑naku (なく; 'not')	/ínakeɾeba/		/ínakɯ/	
FA	‑shikere‑ ‑shiku	oshikere‑ (惜しけれ) oshiku (惜しく; 'being unfortunate')	/óɕi̥keɾeba ~ oɕí̥keɾeba/	/óɕi̥keɾedo/	/óɕi̥kɯ ~ oɕí̥kɯ/	/óɕi̥kɯ(N)ba/
FA	‑shikere‑ ‑shiku	ooshikere‑ (雄々しけれ) ooshiku (雄々しく; 'being manly')	/oóɕi̥keɾeba ~ ooɕí̥keɾeba/	/oóɕi̥keɾedo/	/oóɕi̥kɯ ~ ooɕí̥kɯ/	/oóɕi̥kɯ(N)ba/
FA	‑shikere‑ ‑shiku	ureshikere‑ (嬉しけれ) ureshiku (嬉しく; 'being joyful')	/ɯɾéɕi̥keɾeba ~ ɯɾeɕí̥keɾeba/	/ɯɾéɕi̥keɾedo/	/ɯɾéɕi̥kɯ ~ ɯɾeɕí̥kɯ/	/ɯɾéɕi̥kɯ(N)ba/
FA	‑shikere‑ ‑shiku	onajikere‑ (同じけれ) onajiku (同じく; 'being alike')	/onáʑikeɾeba ~ onaʑíkeɾeba/	/onáʑikeɾedo/	/onáʑikɯ ~ onaʑíkɯ/	/onáʑikɯ(N)ba/
FA	‑shikere‑ ‑shiku	rashikere‑ (らしけれ) rashiku (らしく; 'being likely (to)')	/íɾɯ ɾaɕi̥keɾeba ~ íɾɯ | ɾáɕi̥keɾeba ~ iɾɯ ɾáɕi̥keɾeba/	/íɾɯ ɾaɕi̥keɾedo ~ íɾɯ | ɾáɕi̥keɾedo ~ iɾɯ ɾáɕi̥keɾedo/	/íɾɯ ɾaɕi̥kɯ ~ íɾɯ | ɾáɕi̥kɯ ~ iɾɯ ɾáɕi̥kɯ/	/íɾɯ ɾaɕi̥kɯ(N)ba ~ íɾɯ | ɾáɕi̥kɯ(N)ba ~ iɾɯ ɾáɕi̥kɯ(N)ba/
FA	‑shikere‑ ‑shiku	majikere‑ (まじけれ) majiku (まじく; 'not needing to')	/íɾɯ maʑikeɾeba ~ íɾɯ | máʑikeɾeba ~ iɾɯ máʑikeɾeba/	/íɾɯ maʑikeɾedo ~ íɾɯ | máʑikeɾedo ~ iɾɯ máʑikeɾedo/	/íɾɯ maʑikɯ ~ íɾɯ | máʑikɯ ~ iɾɯ máʑikɯ/	/íɾɯ maʑikɯ(N)ba ~ íɾɯ | máʑikɯ(N)ba ~ iɾɯ máʑikɯ(N)ba/

==== Adjectival irrealis + auxiliary ====
Adjectives have no base irreales, only aru-supported ones which are bound morphemes and must combine with auxiliaries, which can be classified into the following groups (asterisked auxiliaries belong to more than one group). They work exactly like how they do with the verb aru → arō, aran, arazu (有る→有ろう・有らん・あらず; /áɾɯ → aɾóR, aɾáN, áɾazɯ/ 'exists → probably exists/doesn't exist, doesn't exist'). The western/classical/elevated negative auxiliaries listed here require aru-supported irreales; plainer "negatives" are simply combined minor phrases of infinitives and the adjective nai (無い; /nái/ 'is nonexistent'); more at Japanese conjugation (mizenkei base) § Negative: Conjugation table. The ‑n tentative and negative of aru are homophonous, as are those of adjectives.

- Dominant and penultimate-accented (Dom−2):
  - Modern: o (う; /R/)
  - Classical: n / mu, ji*, zari
- Type-preserving and preaccenting (TypPresPre):
  - Modern western: n
  - Pseudo-classical: nu
  - Classical: ji*
- Type-preserving and accenting the second mora before itself, modern western/pseudo-classical: zu

Adjective type			Dom−2 TypPresPre	zu
PA	‑kara‑	akakara‑ (赤から)	/akakaɾóR, akakaɾámɯ → akakaɾáN/ /akakaɾánɯ → akakaɾáN/	/akakáɾazɯ/
PA	‑kara‑	atsukara‑ (厚から)	/atsɯ̥kaɾóR, atsɯ̥kaɾámɯ → atsɯ̥kaɾáN/ /atsɯ̥kaɾánɯ → atsɯ̥kaɾáN/	/atsɯ̥káɾazɯ/
PA	‑kara‑	tōkara‑ (遠から)	/toRkaɾóR, toRkaɾámɯ → toRkaɾáN/ /toRkaɾánɯ → toRkaɾáN/	/toRkáɾazɯ/
PA	‑kara‑	tsɯmetakara‑ (冷たから)	/tsɯmetakaɾóR, tsɯmetakaɾámɯ → tsɯmetakaɾáN/ /tsɯmetakaɾánɯ → tsɯmetakaɾáN/	/tsɯmetakáɾazɯ/
PA	‑kara‑	‑takara‑ (たから)	/itakaɾóR, itakaɾámɯ → itakaɾáN/ /itakaɾánɯ → itakaɾáN/	/itakáɾazɯ/
PA	‑kara‑	‑nakara‑ (なから)	/inakaɾóR/	
PA	‑shikara‑	yasashikara‑ (優しから)	/jasaɕi̥kaɾóR, jasaɕi̥kaɾámɯ → jasaɕi̥kaɾáN/ /jasaɕi̥kaɾánɯ → jasaɕi̥kaɾáN/	/jasaɕi̥káɾazɯ/
PA	‑shikara‑	onajikara‑ (同じから)	/onaʑikaɾóR, onaʑikaɾámɯ → onaʑikaɾáN/ /onaʑikaɾánɯ → onaʑikaɾáN/	/onaʑikáɾazɯ/
FA	‑kara‑	yokara‑ (良から)	/jokaɾóR, jokaɾámɯ → jokaɾáN/ /jokaɾánɯ → jokaɾáN/	/jokáɾazɯ/
FA	‑kara‑	nakara‑ (無から)	/nakaɾóR, nakaɾámɯ → nakaɾáN/ /nakaɾánɯ → nakaɾáN/	/nakáɾazɯ/
FA	‑kara‑	chikakara‑ (近から)	/cɕi̥kakaɾóR, cɕi̥kakaɾámɯ → cɕi̥kakaɾáN/ /cɕi̥kakaɾánɯ → cɕi̥kakaɾáN/	/cɕi̥kakáɾazɯ/
FA	‑kara‑	aokara‑ (青から)	/aokaɾóR, aokaɾámɯ → aokaɾáN/ /aokaɾánɯ → aokaɾáN/	/aokáɾazɯ/
FA	‑kara‑	atsukara‑ (熱から)	/atsɯ̥kaɾóR, atsɯ̥kaɾámɯ → atsɯ̥kaɾáN/ /atsɯ̥kaɾánɯ → atsɯ̥kaɾáN/	/atsɯ̥káɾazɯ/
FA	‑kara‑	kowakara‑ (怖から)	/kowakaɾóR, kowakaɾámɯ → kowakaɾáN/ /kowakaɾánɯ → kowakaɾáN/	/kowakáɾazɯ/
FA	‑kara‑	ōkara‑ (多から)	/oRkaɾóR, oRkaɾámɯ → oRkaɾáN/ /oRkaɾánɯ → oRkaɾáN/	/oRkáɾazɯ/
FA	‑kara‑	mijikakara‑ (短から)	/miʑikakaɾóR, miʑikakaɾámɯ → miʑikakaɾáN/ /miʑikakaɾánɯ → miʑikakaɾáN/	/miʑikakáɾazɯ/
FA	‑kara‑	chīsakara‑ (小さから)	/cɕiRsakaɾóR, cɕiRsakaɾámɯ → cɕiRsakaɾáN/ /cɕiRsakaɾánɯ → cɕiRsakaɾáN/	/cɕiRsakáɾazɯ/
FA	‑kara‑	ōkikara‑ (大きから)	/oRki̥kaɾóR/	/oRki̥káɾazɯ/
FA	‑kara‑	isagiyokara‑ (潔から)	/isaɡijokaɾóR, isaɡijokaɾámɯ → isaɡijokaɾáN/ /isaɡijokaɾánɯ → isaɡijokaɾáN/	/isaɡijokáɾazɯ/
FA	‑kara‑	bekara‑ (可から)	/íɾɯ bekaɾamɯ → íɾɯ bekaɾaN ~ íɾɯ | bekaɾámɯ → íɾɯ | bekaɾáN ~ iɾɯ bekaɾámɯ → iɾɯ bekaɾáN/ /íɾɯ bekaɾanɯ → íɾɯ bekaɾaN ~ íɾɯ | bekaɾánɯ → íɾɯ | bekaɾáN ~ iɾɯ bekaɾánɯ → iɾɯ bekaɾáN/	/íɾɯ bekaɾazɯ ~ íɾɯ | bekáɾazɯ ~ iɾɯ bekáɾazɯ/
FA	‑kara‑	‑takara‑ (たから)	/itakaɾóR, itakaɾámɯ → itakaɾáN/ /itakaɾánɯ → itakaɾáN/	/itakáɾazɯ/
FA	‑kara‑	‑nakara‑ (なから)	/inakaɾóR/	
FA	‑shikara‑	oshikara‑ (惜しから)	/oɕi̥kaɾóR, oɕi̥kaɾámɯ → oɕi̥kaɾáN/ /oɕi̥kaɾánɯ → oɕi̥kaɾáN/	/oɕi̥káɾazɯ/
FA	‑shikara‑	ooshikara‑ (雄々しから)	/ooɕi̥kaɾóR, ooɕi̥kaɾámɯ → ooɕi̥kaɾáN/ /ooɕi̥kaɾánɯ → ooɕi̥kaɾáN/	/ooɕi̥káɾazɯ/
FA	‑shikara‑	ureshikara‑ (嬉しから)	/ɯɾeɕi̥kaɾóR, ɯɾeɕi̥kaɾámɯ → ɯɾeɕi̥kaɾáN/ /ɯɾeɕi̥kaɾánɯ → ɯɾeɕi̥kaɾáN/	/ɯɾeɕi̥káɾazɯ/
FA	‑shikara‑	onajikara‑ (同じから)	/onaʑikaɾóR, onaʑikaɾámɯ → onaʑikaɾáN/ /onaʑikaɾánɯ → onaʑikaɾáN/	/onaʑikáɾazɯ/
FA	‑shikara‑	majikara‑ (まじから)	/íɾɯ maʑikaɾamɯ → íɾɯ maʑikaɾaN ~ íɾɯ | maʑikaɾámɯ → íɾɯ | maʑikaɾáN ~ iɾɯ maʑikaɾámɯ → iɾɯ maʑikaɾáN/	

== Western negative auxiliaries ==
While the western negative ‑zari (from ‑zu ari; see the above sections on auxiliaries following irreales) is simply a dominant and penultimate-accented auxiliary verb, ‑n(u) has its own conjugation that is neither verb-like nor adjective-like. Note that despite the western origin, the following forms are pronounced with Tokyo accent, and their western accent may differ.

Original accent type		Unaccented	Accented
Modern	Imperfect conclusive/attributive/infinitive	/naɾanɯ → naɾaN/ /haɾenɯ → haɾeN/ /inɯ → iN/ /senɯ → seN/	/naɾánɯ → naɾáN/ /haɾénɯ → haɾéN/ /ínɯ → íN/ /imasénɯ → imaséN/ /atsɯ̥kaɾánɯ → atsɯ̥kaɾáN/
Modern	Gerund	/naɾanɯ́ de → naɾáN de/ /haɾenɯ́ de → haɾéN de/ /inɯ́ de → íN de/ /senɯ́ de → séN de/	/naɾánɯ de → naɾáN de/ /haɾénɯ de → haɾéN de/ /ínɯ de → íN de/ /imasénɯ de → imaséN de/ /imasénɯ deɕi̥te → imaséN deɕi̥te/
Modern	Perfect conclusive/attributive	/naɾanáNda/ /haɾenáNda/ /ináNda/ /senáNda/	/naɾánaNda/ /haɾénaNda/ /ínaNda/ /imasénɯ deɕi̥ta → imaséN deɕi̥ta/ /imasénaNda/
Modern	Representative	/naɾanáNdaɾi/ /haɾenáNdaɾi/ /ináNdaɾi/ /senáNdaɾi/	/naɾánaNdaɾi/ /haɾénaNdaɾi/ /ínaNdaɾi/
Modern	Conditional	/naɾanáNdaɾa/ /haɾenáNdaɾa/ /ináNdaɾa/ /senáNdaɾa/	/naɾánaNdaɾa/ /haɾénaNdaɾa/ /ínaNdaɾa/
Modern	Perfect tentative	/naɾanáNdaɾoR/ /haɾenáNdaɾoR/ /ináNdaɾoR/ /senáNdaɾoR/	/naɾánaNdaɾoR/ /haɾénaNdaɾoR/ /ínaNdaɾoR/ /imasénɯ deɕi̥taɾoR → imaséN deɕi̥taɾoR ~ imasénɯ | déɕi̥taɾoR → imaséN | déɕi̥taɾoR/ /imasénaNdaɾoR/
Modern	Provisional	/naɾanéba/ /haɾenéba/ /inéba/ /senéba/	/naɾáneba/ /haɾéneba/ /íneba/ /imaséneba/
Classical base	Infinitive	/naɾazɯ/ /haɾezɯ/ /izɯ/ /sezɯ/	/náɾazɯ/ /háɾezɯ/ /ízɯ/ /imásezɯ/ /atsɯ̥káɾazɯ/
Classical base	Gerund	/naɾazɯ de/ /haɾezɯ de/ /izɯ de/ /sezɯ de/	/náɾazɯ de/ /háɾezɯ de/ /ízɯ de/ /imásezɯ de/ /imásezɯ deɕi̥te/ /atsɯ̥káɾazɯ de/
Classical base	Hypothetical	/naɾázɯ(N)ba ~ naɾazɯ́(N)ba/ /haɾézɯ(N)ba ~ haɾezɯ́(N)ba/ /ízɯ(N)ba ~ izɯ́(N)ba/ /sézɯ(N)ba ~ sezɯ́(N)ba/	/naɾázɯ(N)ba/ /haɾézɯ(N)ba/ /ízɯ(N)ba/ /atsɯ̥kaɾázɯ(N)ba/
Classical base	Imperfect hortative/tentative	/naɾáʑi ~ naɾaʑi/ /haɾéʑi ~ haɾeʑi/ /íʑi ~ iʑi/ /séʑi ~ seʑi/	/naɾáʑi/ /haɾéʑi/ /íʑi/ /atsɯ̥kaɾáʑi/
Classical aru-supported	Imperfect attributive	/naɾazáɾɯ/ /haɾezáɾɯ/ /izáɾɯ/ /sezáɾɯ/ /atsɯ̥kaɾazáɾɯ/	
Classical aru-supported	Imperfect conclusive/infinitive	/naɾazáɾi/ /haɾezáɾi/ /izáɾi/ /sezáɾi/ /atsɯ̥kaɾazáɾi/	
Classical aru-supported	Provisional	/naɾazáɾeba/ /haɾezáɾeba/ /izáɾeba/ /sezáɾeba/ /atsɯ̥kaɾazáɾeba/	
Classical aru-supported	Imperfect hortative/tentative	/naɾazaɾámɯ → naɾazaɾáN/ /haɾezaɾámɯ → haɾezaɾáN/ /izaɾámɯ → izaɾáN/ /sezaɾámɯ → sezaɾáN/ /atsɯ̥kaɾazaɾámɯ → atsɯ̥kaɾazaɾáN/	

== Free word + verb/adjective ==
When a free word combines with a verb or adjective, they simply combine as phrases as described in Japanese pitch accent § Combining minor phrases. However, they can merge into a single verb or adjective in some oft-used idioms and collocations:

- yume + miru → yume miru (夢+見る→夢見る; 'a dream + sees → sees dreams → dreams about'): /jɯmé + míɾɯ → jɯmé miɾɯ ~ jɯme-míɾɯ/
- tate + tsuku → tate tsuku (楯+突く→楯突く; 'a shield + pokes → pokes with a shield → is defiant'): /táte + tsɯ̥kɯ ~ tsɯ̥́kɯ → táte tsɯ̥kɯ ~ tate-tsɯ̥́kɯ/
- muchi + utsu → muchi utsu (鞭+打つ→鞭打つ; 'a whip + lashes → lashes with a whip'): /mɯ́cɕi + ɯ́tsɯ → mɯ́cɕi ɯtsɯ ~ mɯcɕi-ɯ́tsɯ/
- seppa + tsumaru → seppa tsumaru (切羽+詰まる→切羽詰まる; 'a desperate time + is cornered → is desperately cornered'): /séQpa + tsɯmáɾɯ → séQpa tsɯmaɾɯ ~ séQpa | tsɯmáɾɯ ~ seQpa-tsɯmáɾɯ/
- yoku + naru → yoku naru (良く+為る→良くなる; 'being good + becomes → gets better'): /jókɯ + náɾɯ → jókɯ naɾɯ ~ jókɯ | náɾɯ/
  - But: naku + naru → naku naru (亡く+為る→亡くなる; 'being nonexistent + becomes → passes away'): /nákɯ + náɾɯ → nakɯ-naɾɯ/
- totte + kū → totte kū (取って+食う→取って食う; 'taking and + eats → snatches and eats'): /tóQte + kɯ́R → tóQte kɯR ~ tóQte | kɯ́R ~ toQte-kɯ́R/
- totte + kaesu → totte kaesu (取って+返す→取って返す; 'taking and + gives back → turns back'): /tóQte + káesɯ → tóQte kaesɯ ~ tóQte | káesɯ ~ toQte-káesɯ/
- totte + tsukeru → totte tsukeru (取って+付ける→取って付ける; 'taking and + applies → takes and applies'): /tóQte + tsɯ̥kéɾɯ → tóQte tsɯ̥keɾɯ ~ tóQte | tsɯ̥kéɾɯ ~ toQte-tsɯ̥kéɾɯ/
- arare + mo + nai → arare mo nai (有られも+無い→有られも無い; 'being able to exist + even + is nonexistent → is unbecoming'): /aɾáɾe + mo + nái → aɾaɾe-mo-nái ~ aɾaɾé-mo-nai/

=== Gerund + subsidiary ===
Pitch tracks for two different major phrasings of (籠に付いたロープを引っ張ってあげましょう), drawn in Praat, based on two recordings of a female speaker from the companion website of Kōri (2024). From top to bottom: /kaɡo ni ‖ tsɯ ita | ꜜ ɾo Rpɯ o ‖ hiQ pa tte ‖ a ɡemaɕo R/ 'let's pull and raise the rope attached to the basket' /kaɡo ni ‖ tsɯ ita | ꜜ ɾo Rpɯ o ‖ hiQ pa tte | aꜜ ɡemaɕo R/ 'let's do them a favor and pull the rope attached to the basket'

Certain verbs and adjectives can function, after gerunds, as either main verbs/adjectives or subsidiaries (see Japanese conjugation (ren'yōkei base) § Subsidiaries). Poser (1984:161–162, 245, 255) and Martin (2004:533) say main verbs/adjectives form their own minor phrase and subsidiaries are dephrased; (Note: Poser unambiguously says "Example or contrast between two phrasings of [yoNde miru]. The upper trace contains two minor phrases, the lower trace a single minor phrase." The upper pitch trace on page 162 shows two peaks, with the second peak on the main verb /míɾɯ/ being lower, presumably due to downstep after the accent on /jóNde/; while the lower trace shows one peak on /jóNde/, with the subsidiary /míɾɯ/ virtually flattened.) Kōri (2024:58–60) says main verbs/adjectives are not weakened, ie form their own major phrases, and subsidiaries are weakened, ie downstepped in their own minor phrases or dephrased (see Japanese pitch accent § Weakening and major phrasing). Whichever account is accurately reflective of typical pronunciation, main verbs/adjective are more accentually prominent than subsidiaries:

- yonde + miru (読んで+見る; 'reading and + sees'): /jóNde + míɾɯ/
  - → yonde miru (読んで見る; 'reads and sees'): /jóNde | míɾɯ/
  - → yonde miru (読んでみる; 'tries reading'): /jóNde miɾɯ/
- yonde + miru (呼んで+見る; 'calling and + sees'): /joNde + míɾɯ/
  - → yonde miru (呼んで見る; 'calls and sees'): /joNde | míɾɯ/
  - → yonde miru (呼んでみる; 'tries calling'): /joNde míɾɯ/
- aratte + shimatta (洗って+仕舞った; 'washing and + put away'): /aɾaQte + ɕimaQta/
  - → aratte shimatta (洗って仕舞った; 'washed and put away'): /aɾaQte | ɕimaQta/
  - → aratte shimatta (洗ってしまった; 'finished washing'): /aɾaQte ɕimaQta/
- hippatte + agemashō (引っ張って+上げましょう; 'pulling and + let's raise'): /hi̥QpáQte + aɡemaɕóR/
  - → hippatte agemashō (引っ張って上げましょう; 'let's pull and raise'): /hi̥QpáQte ‖ aɡemaɕóR/
  - → hippatte agemashō (引っ張ってあげましょう; 'let's do them a favor and pull'): /hi̥QpáQte | aɡemaɕóR/

In some collocations, the gerund's accent may be overidden by the subsidiary instead:

- totte + kuru → totte kuru (取って+来る→取ってくる; 'taking and + comes → goes take back here'): /tóQte + kɯ́ɾɯ → tóQte kɯɾɯ ~ tóQte | kɯ́ɾɯ ~ toQte-kɯ́ɾɯ/
- motte + kuru → motte kuru (持って+来る→持ってくる; 'holding and + comes → goes bring back here'): /móQte + kɯ́ɾɯ → moQte-kɯ́ɾɯ/
- motte + kite → motte kite (持って+来て→持ってきて; 'holding and + coming and → going bring back here and'): /móQte + {kí̥te → ki̥té} → moQte-kí̥te → moQté-ki̥te/
- motte + iku → motte iku → motte 'ku (持って+行く→持っていく→持ってく; 'holding and + goes → comes bring away'): /móQte + ikɯ → {moQte-ikɯ → moQte-kɯ} ~ {móQte ikɯ → móQte kɯ}/

As noted in the relevant sections above (#Verbal infinitive + particle and #Verbal infinitive + auxiliary), unaccented gerunds become final accented if followed by 'te or 'ta(‑), which are contractions of ite or ita. Also compare 'nai from inai and just nai:

- yonde + ita (呼んで+居た; 'calling and + existed'): /joNde + ita/
  - → yonde ita (呼んでいた; 'had called'): /joNde ita/
    - → yonde 'ta (呼んでた; 'had called'): /joNdé ta/
- yonde + iru (呼んで+居る; 'calling and + exists'): /joNde + iɾɯ/
  - → yonde iru (呼んでいる; 'has called'): /joNde iɾɯ/
    - → yonde 'ru (呼んでる; 'has called'): /joNde ɾɯ/
- yonde + inai (呼んで+居ない; 'calling and + doesn't exist'): /joNde + inai/
  - → yonde inai (呼んでいない; 'hasn't called'): /joNde inai/
    - → yonde 'nai (呼んでない; 'hasn't called'): /joNde nai/
    - → yonde inai ka (呼んでいないか; 'hasn't called?'): /joNde inái ka/
      - → yonde 'nai ka (呼んでない; 'hasn't called?'): /joNde nái ka/
- yonde + nai (呼んで+無い; 'calling and + is nonexistent'): /joNde + nái/
  - → yonde nai (呼んでない; 'hasn't been called'): /joNde nái/
    - → yonde nai ka (呼んでない; 'hasn't been called?'): /joNde nái ka/
- yonde + inakatta (呼んで+居なかった; 'calling and + didn't exist'): /joNde + inákaQta/
  - → yonde inakatta (呼んでいなかった; 'hadn't called'): /joNde inákaQta/
    - → yonde 'nakatta (呼んでなかった; 'hadn't called'): /joNde nákaQta/
- yonde + nakatta (呼んで+無かった; 'calling and + was nonexistent'): /joNde + nákaQta/
  - → yonde nakatta (呼んでなかった; 'hadn't been called'): /joNde nákaQta/

== Bibliography ==
- Akinaga, Kazue (20 December 1998) [25 April 1998]. 共通語のアクセント. In NHK Broadcasting Culture Research Institute (ed.). NHK日本語発音アクセント辞典 新版 (in Japanese) (5th ed.). Shibuya, Tokyo: NHK Publishing. pp. 174–221. ISBN 4-14-011112-7.
- Hirayama, Teruo, ed. (15 September 2010) [30 June 1960]. 全国アクセント辞典 (in Japanese) (31st ed.). Chiyoda, Tokyo: Tokyodo Shuppan. ISBN 978-4-490-10023-5.
- Kibe, Nobuko (2025). "6 Accent in Japanese dialects". In Kibe, Nobuko; Nitta, Tetsuo; Sakaki, Kan (eds.). Handbook of Japanese Dialects. Handbooks of Japanese Language and Linguistics. Vol. 7. Boston; Berlin: De Gruyter Mouton. pp. 149–179. ISBN 978-1-5015-0841-7.
- Kindaichi, Haruhiko; Akinaga, Kazue, eds. (1 April 2025) [10 April 2014]. 新明解日本語アクセント辞典 (in Japanese) (2nd ed.). Chiyoda, Tokyo: Sanseido. ISBN 978-4-385-13468-0.
- Kōri, Shirō (1 September 2024) [1 May 2020]. 日(に)本(ほん)語(ご)のイントネーション――しくみと音(おん)読(どく)・朗(ろう)読(どく)への応(おう)用(よう) (in Japanese) (2nd ed.). Bunkyō, Tokyo: Taishukan. ISBN 978-4-469-21379-9.
- Kubozono, Haruo (11 January 2018) [5 April 2006]. アクセントの法則. 岩波科学ライブラリー (in Japanese). Vol. 118 (on-demand ed.). Chiyoda, Tokyo: Iwanami Shoten. ISBN 978-4-00-730719-5.
- Martin, Samuel Elmo (2004) [1975]. A Reference Grammar of Japanese (revised ed.). Honolulu: University of Hawai'i Press. ISBN 0-8248-2818-6.
- Matsumori, Akiko (1 May 2026) [20 September 2012]. 第３章 アクセントの規則. An Introduction to Japanese Accent 日本語アクセント入門 (in Japanese) (3rd ed.). Chiyoda, Tokyo: Sanseido. pp. 32–45. ISBN 978-4-385-36531-2.
- Nakai, Yukihiko (1 May 2026) [20 September 2012]. 第11章 複合語のアクセント（２）. An Introduction to Japanese Accent 日本語アクセント入門 (in Japanese) (3rd ed.). Chiyoda, Tokyo: Sanseido. pp. 164–181. ISBN 978-4-385-36531-2.
- NHK Broadcasting Culture Research Institute, ed. (20 June 2025) [25 May 2016]. NHK日本語発音アクセント新辞典 (in Japanese) (15th ed.). Shibuya, Tokyo: NHK Publishing. ISBN 978-4-14-011345-5.
- Nitta, Tetsuo (1 May 2026) [20 September 2012]. 第13章 アクセントと音調. An Introduction to Japanese Accent 日本語アクセント入門 (in Japanese) (3rd ed.). Chiyoda, Tokyo: Sanseido. pp. 202–215. ISBN 978-4-385-36531-2.
- Poser, William John (1984). The Phonetics and Phonology of Tone and Intonation in Japanese (doctoral thesis). Cambridge, Massachusetts: Massachusetts Institute of Technology.
- Vance, Timothy John (October 2008). The Sounds of Japanese with Audio CD. Cambridge; New York: Cambridge University Press. ISBN 978-0-521-61754-3.
