= Japanese pitch accent rules =

This article is an non-exhaustive list of rules that govern the Japanese pitch accent as spoken in Tokyo.

== Particles and auxiliaries ==
When a noun, verb or adjective precedes a particle (助詞, joshi) or an auxiliary (助動詞, jodōshi), they may form together a minor phrase. Each particle/auxiliary or group of particles/auxiliaries has its own accentual behavior that can be classified as follows:

- Behavior type:
  - Recessive: The particle or auxiliary does not alter the accent of the preceding word. The word determines the accent of the entire phrase, and if it is accented, the particle either has a low contour or forms its own minor phrase.
  - Dominant: The particle or auxiliary determines the accent of the phrase, overriding whatever accent the preceding word has.
  - Type-preserving (式保存型, shikihozongata): The auxiliary combines with a conjugational verbal form, typically the irrealis (未然形, mizenkei). This form is a bound morpheme, incapable of existing on its own, much less having accent. An auxiliary combining with it preserves the underlying accent type of the original verb.
- Accent type:
  - Unaccented: The particle or auxiliary has no accent of its own.
  - Accented: The particle or auxiliary has accent which surfaces only if it is dominant, or if it is recessive and the preceding word is unaccented.

An accented recessive particle or particle sequence can form its own downstepped minor phrase after an accented word, although this is less likely if the word is final-accented and the particle is initial-accented:

	made (まで; /máde/)	ni mo (にも; /ní mo/)	kara mo (からも; /kaɾá mo/)	dake kara (だけから; /daké kaɾa/)
oyako (親子; 'parents and children')	/ójako | máde/	/ójako | ní mo/	/ójako | kaɾá mo/	/ójako | daké kaɾa/
itoko (いとこ; 'a cousin')	/itóko | máde/	/itóko | ní mo/	/itóko | kaɾá mo/	/itóko | daké kaɾa/
otoko (男; 'a male person')	/otokó made/	/otokó ni mo/	/otokó | kaɾá mo/	/otokó | daké kaɾa/

More details on the interactions between particles or auxiliaries and nouns, verbs and adjectives are listed below.

=== Particle + particle ===
In general, when a particle follows another particle, they form together a single accented minor phrase, as exemplifed in the table above. The first particle's last mora becomes the nucleus. Some of these have become idiomatic conjunctions: /té mo, dé mo, dé wa → ʑáR → ʑa, tó ka, tó mo, ní mo, nó de/ etc. Some more examples:

- kore (此れ; 'this thing'): /koɾe → koɾe ni → koɾe ní wa, koɾe kaɾa → koɾe kaɾá de mo/
- nani (何; 'what'): /náni → náni o → náni o ka ~ náni | ó ka/
- kitto (屹度; 'surely'): /ki̥Qto → ki̥Qtó ka/
- mizu (水; 'water'): /mizɯ → mizɯ de → mizɯ dé sae/
- hana (花; 'a flower'): /haná → haná de → haná de sae/
- haru (春; 'springtime'): /háɾɯ → háɾɯ de → háɾɯ de sae ~ háɾɯ | dé sae/
- amai (甘い; 'is sweet'): /amai → amai dake → amai daké no/
- umai (旨い; 'is tasty'): /umái → umái dake → umái dake no ~ umái | daké no/
- yari (遣り; 'giving to someone else'): /jaɾi → jaQte → jaQté sae/
- yomi (読み; 'reading'): /jómi → jóNde → jóNde kaɾa/

The particles to, kiri, shika and dake alternatively does not add accent to their preceding particle:

- tori (鳥; 'a bird'): /toɾi → toɾi ka → toɾi ká to ~ toɾi ka to/
- mizu (水; 'water'): /mizɯ → mizɯ de → mizɯ dé dake ~ mizɯ de dake/
- naki (泣き; 'crying'): /naki → naite → naité dake ~ naite dake/
- warau (笑う; 'laughs'): /waɾaɯ → waɾaɯ to → waɾaɯ tó ɕi̥ka ~ waɾaɯ to ɕi̥ka/

The accent of the particles kurai / gurai, dokoro and bakari can alternatively surface:

- hito (人; 'a person'): /hi̥toɾi → hi̥to to → hi̥to tó bakaɾi ~ hi̥to to bákaɾi/
- uchi (内; 'the inside'): /ɯcɕi → ɯcɕi ni → ɯcɕi ní bakaɾi ~ ɯcɕi ni bákaɾi/
- naki (泣き; 'crying'): /naki → naite → naité bakaɾi ~ naite bákaɾi/

=== Auxiliary + particle ===
Verb-like and adjective-like auxiliaries simply follow the rules of verb and adjective accent before particles:

- naku (泣く; 'cries'): /nakɯ → nakaɾeɾɯ → nakaɾeɾɯ to, nakaɾe → nakaɾete/
- yomu (読む; 'reads'): /jómɯ → jomaɾéɾɯ → jomaɾéɾɯ to, jomáɾe → jomáɾete/
- arau (洗う; 'washes'): /aɾaɯ → aɾawaseɾɯ → aɾawaseɾɯ to, aɾawase → aɾawase náɡaɾa ~ aɾawase naɡaɾa/
- narau (習う; 'learns'): /naɾáɯ → naɾawaséɾɯ → naɾawaséɾɯ to, naɾawáse → naɾawase náɡaɾa/

The particle to can remove accent from hortatives:

- kiru (着る; 'wears clothes'): /kiɾɯ → kijóR → kijóR to sɯɾɯ ~ kijoR to sɯɾɯ/
- naku (泣く; 'cries'): /nakɯ → nakóR → nakóR to sɯɾɯ ~ nakoR to sɯɾɯ, nakɯ mái → nakɯ mai to sɯɾɯ/

=== Particle + auxiliary ===
In general, when an auxiliary follows another particle, they form together a single accented minor phrase. The particle's last mora becomes the nucleus. Some of these have become idiomatic conjunctions: /dá ɡa, dá kaɾa/ etc. Some more examples:

- soko (其処; 'that place'): /soko → soko de → soɾe dé da/
- sore (其れ; 'that thing'): /soɾe → soɾe ni → soɾe ní desɯ/
- otoko (男; 'a male person'): /otokó → otokó ni → otokó ni desɯ/
- haru (春; 'springtime'): /háɾɯ → háɾɯ ni → háɾɯ ni desɯ ~ háɾɯ | ní desɯ/
- kitto (屹度; 'surely'): /ki̥Qto → ki̥Qtó da, ki̥Qtó desɯ/
- kore (此れ; 'this thing'): /koɾe → koɾe kaɾa → soɾe kaɾá daɾoR ~ soɾe kaɾá | daɾóR/
- nani (何; 'what'): /náni → náni joɾi → náni joɾi da ~ náni | jóɾi da/
- sake (酒; 'liquor'): /sake → sake dake → sake daké da/
- amai (甘い; 'is sweet'): /amai → amai dake → amai daké da/
- umai (旨い; 'is tasty'): /umái → umái dake → umái dake da ~ umái | daké da/
- naku (鳴く; 'cries'): /nakɯ → nakɯ̥ to → nakɯ̥ tó da, nakɯ́ no → nakɯ́ no daɾoR ~ nakɯ́ no | daɾóR, nakɯ máde → nakɯ máde | désɯ, nakɯ dake → nakɯ daké daɾoR ~ nakɯ daké | daɾóR/
- taberu (食べる; 'eats'): /tabéɾɯ → tabéɾɯ to → tabéɾɯ to desɯ ~ tabéɾɯ | tó desɯ, tabéɾɯ no → tabéɾɯ no daɾoR ~ tabéɾɯ no | daɾóR, tabéɾɯ made ~ tabéɾɯ máde → tabéɾɯ made desɯ ~ tabéɾɯ | máde | désɯ, tabéɾɯ dake → tabéɾɯ dake desɯ ~ tabéɾɯ | daké desɯ/

The accent of the auxiliaries yō (da), rashī and gotoshi can alternatively surface:

- tori (鳥; 'a bird'): /toɾi → toɾi to → toɾi tó ɾaɕiR ~ toɾi tó | ɾaɕíR ~ toɾi to ɾaɕíR/
- hana (花; 'a flower'): /haná → haná to → haná to ɾaɕiR ~ haná to | ɾaɕíR ~ hana to ɾaɕíR/

=== Auxiliary + auxiliary ===
Verb-like and adjective-like auxiliaries simply follow the rules of verb and adjective accent before auxiliaries:

- arau (洗う; 'washes'): /aɾaɯ → aɾawaseɾɯ → aɾawaseɾaɾeɾɯ, aɾawase → aɾawaseta → aɾawaseta daɾóR ~ aɾawasetá daɾoR ~ aɾawasetá | daɾóR/
- narau (習う; 'learns'): /naɾáɯ → naɾawaséɾɯ → naɾawaseɾaɾéɾɯ, naɾawáse → naɾawáseta → naɾawáseta daɾoR ~ naɾawáseta | daɾóR/
- naki (泣き; 'crying'): /naki → naki̥tai ~ naki̥tái → naki̥tai daɾóR ~ naki̥taí daɾoR → naki̥tái daɾoR ~ naki̥taí | daɾóR → naki̥tái | daɾóR/
- yomi (読み; 'reading'): /jómi → jomitái → jomitái daɾoR ~ jomitái | daɾóR/

== Nouns ==
Here are some rough percentage ratios in correspondence with the mora counts of nouns (0 means unaccented, +1 initial-accented, −1 final-accented, −2 penultimate-accented, −3 antepenultimate-accented and −4 preantepenultimate-accented):

1. Unimorae: +1:0 → 70:30
2. Bimorae: +1:−1:0 → 60:20:20
3. Trimorae: +1:−2:−1:0 → 40:10:10:50 (10% is either 0 or +1)
4. Quadrimorae: +1:−3:−2:0 → 10:10:10:70
5. Quinquemorae: −4:−3:−2:0 → 10:50:10:30
6. Sexamorae: −4:−3:−2:0 → 35:35:10:20

One of the principal rules that govern nouns is known as the "antepenultimate rule" (−3の規則, mainasu san no kisoku; lit. 'the minus 3 rule'), which dictates a "default" location for the accent nucleus, which is either the actual antepenultimate mora (−3), or the preantepenultimate mora (−4) due to a leftward shift away from the deficient antepenultimate mora (see Japanese pitch accent § Accent shifts; also compare Latin's penultimate rule). Even native speakers rely on this rule, among others, to guess how to pronounce newly borrowed or unfamiliar simplex or compound nouns, even completely made-up ones such as /aiɯ́eo, kakikɯ̥́keko, akasátana, hamajáɾawa/. As the above statistics show, the antepenultimate rule accounts for the high number of quinquemoraic or longer (pre)antepenultimate-accented nouns. It is also highly productive among recent loanwords of any length (although unimorae and bimorae do not have room for an antepenultimate mora and are thus necessarily initial-accented) and will continue to be so as more words are imported into the Japanese language.

Quadrimoraic nouns are predominantly (70%) unaccented. Unaccentedness is also typical in high-frequency words, and even a normally accented word can be deaccentuated by an individual if they use it frequently enough; for example, the word gitā (ギター) can be pronounced unaccented as /ɡitaR/ by a guitar lover, instead of accented as /ɡítaR/. Quadrimoraic clippings are overwhelmingly unaccented and their number is on the increase.

Older speakers are more likely to have final-accented quinquemorae, and penultimate-accented sexamorae ending in special morae, both of which younger speakers are making (pre)antepenultimate-accented (the dagger ^{†} marks obsolete or obsolescent accent):

- ishidatami (石畳; 'stone paving'): /^{†}iɕidatamí ~ iɕidátami/
- mizuguruma (水車; 'a waterwheel'): /^{†}mizɯɡɯɾɯmá ~ mizɯɡɯ́ɾɯma/
- yakidōfu (焼き豆腐; 'broiled tofu'): /^{†}jakidoRɸɯ́ ~ jakidóRɸɯ/
- sumōtori (相撲取り; 'a sumo wrestler'): /^{†}sɯmoRtoɾí ~ sɯmóRtoɾi/
- ishidōrō (石灯籠; 'a stone lantern'): /^{†}iɕidoɾóR ~ iɕidóRɾoR/
- aodaishō (青大将; 'a Japanese rat snake'): /^{†}aodaiɕóR ~ aodáiɕoR ~ aodaiɕoR/
- aotenjō (青天井; 'the blue vault of heaven'): /^{†}aoteNʑóR ~ aotéNʑoR/

=== Simplex Sino-Japanese nouns ===
Over half of simplex Sino-Japanese nouns (spelt with a single kanji), especially infrequent ones, are initial-accented. The following are rough percentages in correspondence with mora counts, as well as some representative examples. Note that there are items with variant patterns, some of which may be used for different meanings:

	Initial-accented	Final-accented	Unaccented
Unimorae	68%	0%	32%
Unimorae	gu (具; /ɡɯ́/ 'a tool'), sho (書; /ɕó/ 'penmanship ~ a document'), etc.		gu (具; /ɡɯ/ 'a solid ingredient'), sho (書; /ɕo ~ ɕó/ 'a manuscript'), etc.
Bimorae	77%	23%	
Bimorae	kon (根; /kóN/ 'a radical'), zatsu ~ zō (雑; /zátsɯ ~ zóR/ 'miscellaneous'), san (産; /sáN/ 'agricultural produce'), jō (錠; /ʑóR/ 'a pill'), shoku (食; /ɕókɯ/ 'an eclipse'), hen (辺; /héN/ 'a geometric side'), Bon (盆; /bóN ~ boN/), men (面; /méN/ 'a surface'), raku (楽; /ɾákɯ/ 'a finale'), rei (礼; /ɾéi/ 'a ceremony'), etc.	(Note: Bimoraic nouns are more likely final-accented if they end in ‑ki, ‑ku, ‑chi or ‑tsu.)kotsu (骨; /kotsɯ́/ 'ashes'), raku (楽; /ɾakɯ́/ 'comfort'), roku (陸; /ɾokɯ́/ 'six'), etc.	kotsu (骨; /kotsɯ/ 'the essentials'), kon (根; /koN/ 'endurance'), zatsu (雑; /zatsɯ/ 'crude'), san (三・産; /saN/ 'three; a birth'), jō (情・錠; /ʑoR/ 'feelings; a lock'), shoku (食; /ɕokɯ/ 'eating'), hen (辺; /heN/ 'a locality'), bon (盆; /boN/ 'a tray'), men (面; /meN/ 'a mask'), rei (礼; /ɾei/ 'a reward'), roku (陸; /ɾokɯ/ 'neat'), etc.

=== Modifier–head compound nouns ===
This subsection deals with modifier–head compound nouns, with the modifier being the first component and the head being the second. Henceforth:

- A "short" component:
  - If native, is bimoraic or shorter: ya (屋), yama (山), etc.
  - If Sino-Japanese, has one kanji (monomorphematic): ‑ka (化), etc.
- A "long" component:
  - If native, is trimoraic or longer: yanagi (柳), kumiai (組合), etc.
  - If Sino-Japanese, has two or more kanji (dimorphematic or longer): shugi (主義), kaisha (会社), kairyū (海流), etc.
- A short compound consists of only short components, and a long compound contains at least one long component. Note that a short compound can become a long component in a long compound.

==== Short compounds ====
Short compound nouns are accentually difficult to predict, as their accent correlates with the modifiers and/or the heads, in terms of mora counts and/or original accent.

===== Native heads =====
====== Unimoraic modifier + native head ======
The compound tends to have the same accent type as the modifier and retain its nucleus:

- Originally unaccented modifiers:
  - ke + ha → keba (毛+羽→毛羽; 'feathers + a feather → fuzz'): /ke + ha → ke-ba/
  - ka + ya → kaya (蚊+屋→蚊帳; 'a mosquito + a house → a mosquito net'): /ka + já → ka-ja/
  - ha + ne → hane (羽+根→羽根; 'a feather + a root → a feather'): /ha + né → ha-ne/
  - to + kuchi → toguchi (戸+口→戸口; 'a door + a door → the doorway'): /to + kɯ̥cɕi → to-ɡɯcɕi/
  - cha + hako → chabako (茶+箱→茶箱; 'tea + box → a tea box'): /cɕa + hako → cɕa-bako/
  - ke + mono → kemono (毛+物→獣; 'hair + a thing → a beast'): /ke + monó → ke-mono/
  - ne + iro → neiro (音+色→音色; 'sound + a color → timbre'): /ne + iɾó → ne-iɾo/
  - na + mae → namae (名+前→名前; 'a name + before → a name'): /na + máe → na-mae/
  - hi + kage → hikage (日+陰→日陰; 'the sun + shade → shade'): /hi + káɡe → hi̥-kaɡe/
  - ho + fune → hobune (帆+船→帆船; 'a sail + a watercraft → a sailboat'): /ho ~ hó + ɸɯ́ne → ho-bɯne/
  - ko + inu → koinu (子+犬→子犬; 'a child + a dog → a puppy'): /ko + inɯ́ → ko-inɯ/
- Originally accented modifiers:
  - i + to → ido (井+戸→井戸; 'a well + a door → a well'): /í + to → í-do/
  - yu + ha → yuba (湯+葉→湯葉; 'hot water + a leaf → tofu skin'): /jɯ́ + ha → jɯ́-ba/
  - no + hi → nobi (野+火→野火; 'a field + a fire → a field fire'): /nó + hí → nó-bi/
  - yo + me → yome (夜+目→夜目; 'night + an eye → night vision'): /jó + mé → jó-me/
  - hi + hana → hibana (火+花→火花; 'a fire + a flower → a spark'): /hí + haná → hí-bana/
  - no + hara → nohara (野+原→野原; 'a field + a plain → a plain'): /nó + háɾa → nó-haɾa/
  - yo + tsuyu → yotsuyu (夜+露→夜露; 'night + dew → night dew'): /jó + tsɯ́jɯ → jó-tsɯjɯ/
  - te + kubi → tekubi (手+首→手首; 'an arm + a neck → a wrist'): /té + kɯbi → té-kɯbi/
  - me + kane → megane (眼+金→眼鏡; 'an eye + metal → eyeglasses'): /mé + kane → mé-ɡane/

Some compounds retain the bimoraic head's accent instead or in addition:

- me + tama → medama (目+玉→目玉; 'an eye + a ball → an eyeball'): /mé + tamá → me-damá/
- ne + moto → nemoto (根+元→根元; 'a root + a base → the base'): /né + motó ~ moto → ne-motó/
- ko + yagi → koyagi (子+山羊→子山羊; 'a child + a goat → a kid'): /ko + jáɡi → ko-jaɡi ~ ko-jáɡi/
- ko + neko → koneko (子+猫→子猫; 'a child + a cat → a kitten'): /ko + néko → ko-néko/
- hi + kasa → higasa (日+傘→日傘; 'the sun + an umbrella → a parasol'): /hi + kása → hi-ɡása/
- na + tane → natane (菜+種→菜種; 'rape + seed → rapeseed'): /ná + táne → na-táne/
- hi + tane → hidane (火+種→火種; 'a fire + seed → an incendiary spark'): /hí + táne → hi-dáne/
- yu + oke → yuoke (湯+桶→湯桶; 'a bath + a tub → a bathtub'): /jɯ́ + óke → jɯ-óke ~ jɯ-oke/

====== Bimoraic modifier + native head ======
The compound tends to have the same accent type as the modifier, but the compound's nucleus tends to be the modifier's last mora regardless of the modifier's original nucleus:

- Originally unaccented modifiers:
  - hana + chi → hanaji (鼻+血→鼻血; 'a nose + blood → a nosebleed'): /hana + cɕi → hana-ʑi/
  - kuchi + hi → kuchibi (口+火→口火; 'a mouth + a fire → a fuse'): /kɯ̥cɕi + hí → kɯ̥cɕi-bi/
  - kubi + wa → kubiwa (首+輪→首輪; 'a neck + a hoop → a necklace'): /kɯbi + wá → kɯbi-wa/
  - koshi + yu → koshiyu (腰+湯→腰湯; 'hips + a bath → a hip bath'): /koɕi + jɯ́ → koɕi-jɯ/
  - tori + me → torime (鳥+目→鳥目; 'a bird + an eye → night-blindness'): /toɾi + mé → toɾi-me/
  - migi + te → migite (右+手→右手; 'right + a hand → the right hand'): /miɡi + té → miɡi-te/
  - kizu + kuchi → kizuguchi (傷+口→傷口; 'a wound + a mouth → the mouth of a wound'): /kizɯ + kɯ̥cɕi → kizɯ-ɡɯcɕi/
  - kiri + hako → kiribako (霧+箱→霧箱; 'fog + a box → a cloud chamber'): /kiɾi + hako → kiɾi-bako/
  - take + kago → takekago (竹+籠→竹籠; 'bamboo + a basket → a bamboo basket'): /take + kaɡo → take-kaɡo/
  - niwa + tori → niwatori (庭+鳥→鶏; 'a garden + a bird → a chicken'): /niwa + toɾi → niwa-toɾi/
  - hana + mizu → hanamizu (鼻+水→鼻水; 'a nose + water → mucus'): /hana + mizɯ → hana-mizɯ ~ hana-mízɯ/
  - ame + tama → amedama (飴+玉→飴玉; 'candy + a ball → a sugarplum'): /ame + tamá → ame-dama/
  - shiro + yama → Shiroyama (城+山→城山; 'a castle + a mountain → Shiroyama'): /ɕiɾo + jamá → ɕiɾo-jama/
  - mizu + oto → mizuoto (水+音→水音; 'sound + mizuoto → the sound of water'): /mizɯ + otó → mizɯ-oto/
  - hito + naka → hitonaka (人+中→人中; 'people + the middle → the public'): /hi̥to + náka → hi̥to-naka/
- Originally accented modifiers:
  - tama + ko → tamago (玉+子→卵; 'a ball + a child → an egg'): /tamá + ko → tamá-ɡo ~ tama-ɡo/
  - natsu + hi → natsubi (夏+日→夏日; 'summer + a day → a summer day'): /natsɯ́ + hi → natsɯ́-bi/
  - iro + me → irome (色+目→色目; 'a color + an eye → a shade'): /iɾó + mé → iɾó-me ~ iɾo-mé/
  - sumi + hi → sumibi (炭+火→炭火; 'charcoal + a fire → a charcoal fire'): /sɯmí + hí → sɯmí-bi/
  - tsuki + yo → tsukiyo (月+夜→月夜; 'the moon + a night → a moonlit night'): /tsɯ̥kí + jó → tsɯ̥kí-jo/
  - hana + me → haname (花+芽→花芽; 'a flower + a bud → a flower bud'): /haná + mé → haná-me/
  - ame + to → amado (雨+戸→雨戸; 'rain + a door → a storm door'): /áme + to → amá-do/
  - soba + yu → sobayu (蕎麦+湯→蕎麦湯; 'soba + hot water → soba water'): /sóba + jɯ́ → sobá-jɯ/
  - eri + kubi → erikubi (襟+首→襟首; 'the nape + a neck → the nape'): /eɾí + kɯbi → eɾí-kɯbi/
  - hana + yome → hanayome (花+嫁→花嫁; 'a flower + a bride → a bride'): /haná + jome → haná-jome/
  - yama + tori → yamadori (山+鳥→山鳥; 'a mountain + a bird → a mountain bird'): /jamá + toɾi → jamá-doɾi/
  - iro + kami → irogami (色+紙→色紙; 'a color + paper → colored paper'): /iɾó + kamí → iɾó-ɡami/
  - kona + yuki → konayuki (粉+雪→粉雪; 'powder + snow → powdery snow'): /koná + jɯkí → koná-jɯki/
  - mono + koto → monogoto (物+事→物事; 'a thing + a thing → things'): /monó + kotó → monó-ɡoto/
  - asa + kao → asagao (朝+顔→朝顔; 'the morning + a face → morning glory'): /ása + kao → asá-ɡao/
  - ito + kuchi → itoguchi (糸+口→糸口; 'thread + a mouth → the end of a thread'): /íto + kɯ̥cɕi → itó-ɡɯcɕi/
  - haru + kaze → harukaze (春+風→春風; 'springtime + wind → spring wind'): /háɾɯ + kaze → haɾɯ́-kaze/
  - matsu + mushi → matsumushi (松+虫→松虫; 'pine + an insect → a pine cricket'): /mátsɯ + mɯɕi → matsɯ́-mɯɕi/
  - sora + mame → soramame (空+豆→空豆; 'a void + beans → a broad bean'): /sóɾa + mamé → soɾá-mame/
  - hato + mune → hatomune (鳩+胸→鳩胸; 'a pigeon + a breast → a pigeon breast'): /háto + mɯné → ható-mɯne/

If the modifier's last mora is special, it's penultimate mora is accented instead:

- hō + ha → hōba (朴+歯→朴歯; 'a magnolia + a tooth → magnolia clog supports'): /hóR + há → hóR-ba ~ hoR-ba/
- kami + nushi → kannushi (神+主→神主; 'a god + a household head → a Shinto priest'): /kámi + nɯ́ɕi → káN-nɯɕi/
- mai‑ + asa → maiasa (毎+朝→毎朝; 'each + morning → each morning'): /mái ~ mai + ása → mái-asa ~ mai-asa/
- shin‑ + mi → shinmi (親+身→親身; 'close + one's body → a relative'): /ɕíN + mi → ɕíN-mi/
- ō + te → ōte (王+手→王手; 'a king + a move → a check'): /óR + té → óR-te/
- gin + kami → gingami (銀+紙→銀紙; 'silver + paper → silver paper'): /ɡíN + kamí → ɡíN-ɡami/
- Tō + nasu → Tōnasu (唐+茄子→唐茄子; 'Tang + an aubergine → a pumpkin'): /tóR + násɯ → tóR-nasɯ/

If the head is bimoraic, the compound may also be unaccented:

- ami + tana → amidana (網+棚→網棚; 'a grate + a shelf → a luggage rack'): /amí + tana → ami-dana/
- imo + kayu → imogayu (芋+粥→芋粥; 'a potato + congee → potato congee'): /imó + kajɯ → imo-ɡajɯ/
- kawa + oto → kawaoto (川+音→川音; 'a river + sound → the sound of a river'): /kawá + otó → kawa-oto/
- yama + inu → yamainu (山+犬→山犬; 'a mountain + a dog → a wild dog'): /jamá + inɯ́ → jama-inɯ/
- oya + fune → oyabune (親+船→親船; 'a parent + a watercraft → a mother ship'): /ojá + ɸɯ́ne → oja-bɯne/
- asa + ito → asaito (麻+糸→麻糸; 'hemp + thread → hemp thread'): /asá + íto → asa-ito/
- ki + tama → kodama (木+霊→木霊; 'a tree + a spirit → a dryad'): /kí + táma → ko-dama/
- kinu + ito → kinuito (絹+糸→絹糸; 'silk + thread → silk thread'): /kínɯ + íto → kinɯ-ito/
- sora + mimi → soramimi (空+耳→空耳; 'a void + an ear → mishearing'): /sóɾa + mimi → soɾa-mimi/
- soto + mago → sotomago (外+孫→外孫; 'the outside + a grandchild → one's maternal grandchild'): /sóto + maɡó → soto-maɡo/
- ten + mado → tenmado (天+窓→天窓; 'the sky + a window → a skylight'): /téN + mádo → teN-mado/
- haru + ame → harusame (春+雨→春雨; 'springtime + rain → spring rain'): /háɾɯ + áme → haɾɯ-same/

Some compounds retain the modifier's initial accent, or delete its final accent:

- Originally initial-accented modifiers:
  - asa + hi → asahi (朝+日→朝日; 'the morning + the sun → the morning sun'): /ása + hi → ása-hi/
  - hana + hi → hanabi (花+火→花火; 'a flower + a fire → fireworks'): /haná + hí → hána-bi/
  - matsu + ha → matsuba (松+葉→松葉; 'pine + a leaf → a pine needle'): /mátsɯ + ha → mátsɯ-ba/
  - mayu + ke → mayuge (眉+毛→眉毛; 'an eyebrow + hair → an eyebrow'): /májɯ + ke → májɯ-ɡe/
- Originally final-accented modifiers:
  - mune + ke → munage (胸+毛→胸毛; 'a chest + hair → chest hair'): /mɯné + ke → mɯna-ɡe/
  - yubi + wa → yubiwa (指+輪→指輪; 'a finger + a hoop → a finger ring'): /jɯbí + wá → jɯbi-wa/

Some compounds retain the bimoraic head's initial accent instead or in addition:

- mizu + umi → mizuumi (水+海→湖; 'water + a sea → a lake'): /mizɯ + ɯ́mi → mizɯ-ɯ́mi/
- tama + negi → tamanegi (玉+葱→玉葱; 'a ball + Welsh onion → common onion'): /tamá + néɡi → tama-néɡi/
- hana + muko → hanamuko (花+婿→花婿; 'a flower + a bridegroom → a bridegroom'): /haná + mɯ́ko → hana-mɯ́ko ~ haná-mɯko/
- mame + tsubu → mametsubu (豆+粒→豆粒; 'beans + a grain → a bean'): /mamé + tsɯ́bɯ → mame-tsɯ́bɯ/
- ame + kasa → amagasa (雨+傘→雨傘; 'rain + an umbrella → an umbrella'): /áme + kása → ama-ɡása/

===== Sino-Japanese heads =====
====== Unimoraic modifier + unimoraic Sino-Japanese head ======
Almost 80% of these compounds are initial-accented: iki (意気; /íki/ 'mettle'), kachi (価値; /kácɕi/ 'value'), kiju (喜寿; /kíʑɯ/ 'one's 77th birthday'), shumi (趣味; /ɕɯ́mi/ 'a hobby'), chiri (地理; /cɕíɾi/ 'geography'), tosho (図書; /tóɕo/ 'books'), basha (馬車; /báɕa/ 'a horse-drawn carriage'), muchi (無知; /mɯ́cɕi/ 'ignorance'), rika (理科; /ɾíka/ 'science'), richi (理知; /ɾícɕi/ 'intellect'), etc.

A devoiced nucleus may cause a rightward shift: kika (気化; /kí̥ka → ki̥ká/ 'evaporation'), (基地; /kí̥cɕi → ki̥cɕí/ 'an operational base'), kiso (基礎; /kí̥so → ki̥só/ 'a fundamental foundation'), chika (地下; /cɕí̥ka → cɕi̥ká/ 'the underground'), chiku (地区; /cɕí̥kɯ → cɕi̥kɯ́/ 'a region'), hisho (避暑; /hí̥ɕo → hi̥ɕó/ 'escape from summer heat'), fuka (不可; /ɸɯ̥́ka → ɸɯ̥ká/ 'untenable'), etc.

Some older compounds are unaccented or final-accented:

- Unaccented: isu (椅子; /isɯ/ 'a chair'), kuge (公家; /kɯɡe/ 'a Japanese courtier'), goma (胡麻; /ɡoma/ 'sesame'), (棕梠; /ɕɯɾo ~ ɕɯ́ɾo/ 'windmill palm'), buji (無事; /bɯʑi/ 'security'), ruri (瑠璃; /ɾɯɾi ~ ɾɯ́ɾi/ 'lapis lazuli'), guchi (愚痴; /ɡɯcɕi/ 'a silly grumble'), geka (外科; /ɡeka/ 'surgery'), jama (邪魔; /ʑama/ 'a hindrance'), isha (医者; /iɕa/ 'a physician'), geri (下痢; /ɡeɾi/ 'diarrhoea'), shiso (紫蘇; /ɕi̥so/), land (土地; /tocɕi/ 'tochi'), (被布; /hiɸɯ ~ hi̥ɸɯ/ 'a hifu'), basho (場所; /baɕo/ 'a place'), etc.
- Final-accented: iji (意地; /iʑí/ 'one's nature'), giri (義理; /ɡiɾí/ 'moral obligation'), chie (知恵; /cɕié/ 'wisdom'), gaki (餓鬼; /ɡakí ~ ɡáki/ 'a hungry ghost'), kega (怪我; /keɡá/ 'an injury'), koke (虚仮; /koké/ 'an idiot'), etc.

====== Bimoraic modifier + unimoraic Sino-Japanese head ======
Most of these compounds are initial-accented or unaccented. Semantically nominal compounds are mostly initial-accented, while semantically verbal compounds are mostly unaccented:

- Semantically nominal: aiji (愛児; /áiʑi/ 'one's beloved child'), unga (運河; /ɯ́Nɡa/ 'a canal'), enryo (遠慮; /éNɾjo/ 'foresight'), gansho (願書; /ɡáNɕo/ 'a written request'), kyūka (旧家; /kjɯ́Rka ~ kjɯRka/ 'a long-standing family'), kinjo (近所; /kíNʑo/ 'the neighborhood'), gunbu (軍部; /ɡɯ́Nbɯ/ 'the military brass'), kokka (国家; /kóQka/ 'a nation'), kokudo (国土; /kókɯdo/ 'a territory'), sūchi (数値; /sɯ́Rcɕi/ 'a numerical value'), seishi (世子・誓詞・誓紙・正史・正使; /séiɕi/ 'the heir to lordship; a pledge; a written pledge; an official account of history; a chief envoy'), hakushi (博士; /hákɯ̥ɕi/ 'an academic doctor'), etc.
- Semantically verbal: akka (悪化; /aQka/ 'deterioration'), anki (暗記; /aNki/ 'rote learning'), itchi (一致; /iQcɕi/ 'agreement'), inshu (飲酒; /iNɕɯ/ 'boozing'), enki (延期; /eNki/ 'postponement'), enryo (遠慮; /eNɾjo/ 'discretion'), kaishi (開始; /kaiɕi/ 'a commencement'), shusse (出世; /ɕɯ̥Qse ~ ɕɯ̥Qse/ 'getting ahead in life'), shokuji (食事; /ɕokɯʑi/ 'a meal'), seishi (製糸・製紙・制止・静止; /seiɕi/ 'filature; papermaking; control; repose'), seishi (正視; /seiɕi ~ séiɕi/ 'confrontation'), nyūkyo (入居; /njɯRkjo/ 'moving in'), etc.

Note that some of the unaccented semantically verbal compounds above are not really modifier–head compounds, but rather verb–object compounds as per Chinese syntax (see Chinese grammar §§ Noun phrases and Sentence structure). For example, inshu (飲酒) comes from in ("drinks") and shu ("booze"), hence "drinking booze."

A devoiced nucleus may cause a rightward shift: shikiso (色素; /ɕíki̥so → ɕi̥kíso/ 'a pigment'), shukujo (淑女; /ɕɯ̥́kɯʑo → ɕɯ̥kɯ́ʑo/ 'a lady'), shitsui (失意; /ɕí̥tsɯi → ɕi̥tsɯ́i/ 'disappointment'), chitsujo (秩序; /cɕí̥tsɯʑo → cɕi̥tsɯ́ʑo/ 'public order'), Shikibu (式部; /ɕi̥kíbɯ/ 'the Ministry of Ceremonial Affairs'), shukusha (宿舎; /ɕɯ̥kɯ́ɕa/ 'lodging'), etc.

Some old trimoraic compounds may be final- or penultimate-accented:

- Final-accented: kakke (脚気; /kaQké/ 'beriberi'), gyōja (行者; /ɡjoRʑá ~ ɡjóRʑa/ 'an ascetic'), sekku (節句; /seQkɯ́ ~ seQkɯ/ 'a seasonal festival'), dōgu (道具; /doRɡɯ́/ 'a tool'), dōri (道理; /doRɾí/ 'common sense'), fukusa (袱紗; /ɸɯ̥kɯsá ~ ɸɯ̥kɯsa/ 'a fukusa'), henji (返事; /heNʑí/ 'a reply'), sekisho (関所; /seki̥ɕó/ 'a checkpoint'), etc.
- Penultimate-accented: kakugo (覚悟; /kakɯ́ɡo ~ kákɯɡo/ 'readiness'), gokui (極意; /ɡokɯ́i ~ ɡókɯi/ 'arcane knowledge'), etc.

Some originally accented native modifiers may make its own last mora the nucleus, as they would if the head were also native:

- ame + gu → amagu (雨+具→雨具; 'rain + a tool → rain gear'): /áme + ɡɯ́ → amá-ɡɯ/
- kage + e → kagee (影+絵→影絵; 'a shadow + an illustration → a shadowgraph'): /káɡe + é → kaɡé-e/
- mugi + cha → mugicha (麦+茶→麦茶; 'barley + tea → barley tea'): /mɯ́ɡi + cɕa → mɯɡí-cɕa/
- yama + shi → yamashi (山+師→山師; 'a mountain + a master → a speculator'): /jamá + ɕí → jamá-ɕi/
- machi + ‑i → machii (町+医→町医; 'a town + a physician → a general practitioner'): /macɕí + í → macɕí-i/

The suffixal head ‑sho/‑jo (所; 'a place') often results in final-accented compounds: yakusho (役所; /jakɯ̥ɕó/ 'a government office'), benjo (便所; /beNʑó/ 'a restroom'), etc.

====== Unimoraic modifier + bimoraic Sino-Japanese head ======
Some 74% of these compounds are unaccented. Semantically nominal ones are mostly initial-accented, and while semantically verbal ones mostly unaccented: chiryō (治療; /cɕiɾjoR ~ ʑiɾjoR/ 'therapy'), kibō (希望; /kiboR/ 'hope'), shuzan (珠算; /ɕɯzaN/ 'abacus calculation'), etc.

A devoiced nucleus may cause a rightward shift: Kishū (紀州; /kí̥ɕɯR → ki̥ɕɯ́R/ 'Kii Province'), kushin (苦心; /kɯ̥́ɕiN → kɯ̥ɕíN/ 'hard work'), chihō (地方; /cɕíhoR ~ cɕí̥hoR → cɕihóR ~ cɕi̥hóR/ 'a locality'), kikai (機械; /ki̥kái/ 'a machine'), fukin (布巾; /ɸɯ̥kíN/ 'a dish towel'), etc.

Some older compounds are final- or penultimate-accented:

- Final-accented: kojiki (乞食; /koʑikí/ 'a beggar'), jigoku (地獄; /ʑiɡokɯ́ ~ ʑiɡokɯ/ 'hell'), etc.
- Penultimate-accented:
  - keshō (化粧; /keɕóR/ 'makeup'), gehin (下品; /ɡehíN/ 'low-class'), koshō (胡椒; /koɕóR/ 'black pepper'), zazen (座禅; /zazéN ~ zazeN/ 'seated meditation'), satō (砂糖; /satóR/ 'sugar'), jiyū (自由; /ʑijɯ́R/ 'freedom'), shotai (所帯; /ɕotái ~ ɕótai/ 'a household'), sekai (世界; /sekái ~ sékai/ 'a world'), zukin (頭巾; /zɯkíN/ 'a hood'), doyō (土用; /dojóR ~ dojoR/ 'the dog days'), bushō (不精; /bɯɕóR/ 'indolence'), etc.
  - ehon (絵本; /ehóN/ 'a picture book'), tehon (手本; /tehóN/ 'an exemplar'), tesū (手数; /tesɯ́R/ 'trouble'), etc.

====== Bimoraic modifier + bimoraic Sino-Japanese head ======
Some 85% of these compounds, which are quadrimoraic, are unaccented. Some used to be initial-accented, but have become unaccented (the ^{†} marks obsolete or obsolescent accent)ː

- aiken (愛犬; /aikeN/ 'one's pet dog'), aibyō (愛猫; /aibjoR/ 'one's pet cat'), gakushū (学習; /ɡakɯ̥ɕɯR/ 'learning'), suiei (水泳; /sɯiei/ 'swimming'), etc.
- kanren (関連; /^{†}káNɾeN ~ kaNɾeN/ 'relation'), kyūmei (糾明; /^{†}kjɯ́Rmei ~ kjɯRmei/ 'examination and illumination'), shinrui (親類; /^{†}ɕíNɾɯi ~ ɕiNɾɯi/ 'a relative'), (襲名; /^{†}ɕɯ́Rmei ~ ɕɯRmei/ 'succession to a name'), etc.
- kinkaku (金閣; /kíNkakɯ ~ kiNkakɯ/ 'a gold pavilion'), ginkaku (銀閣; /ɡíNkakɯ ~ ɡiNkakɯ/ 'a silver pavilion'), kōzui (洪水; /kóRzɯi ~ koRzɯi/ 'a flood'), sōzoku (相続; /sóRzokɯ ~ soRzokɯ/ 'succession to a position'), taiketsu (対決; /táiketsɯ ~ taiketsɯ/ 'confrontation'), tanmei (短命; /táNmei ~ taNmei/ 'a short life'), rōjō (籠城; /ɾóRʑoR ~ ɾoRʑoR/ 'holing up in a castle'), etc.
- Gokuraku (極楽; /ɡokɯɾakɯ́ ~ ɡokɯɾakɯ/ 'Sukhavati'), dōraku (道楽; /doRɾakɯ́ ~ doRɾákɯ ~ doRɾakɯ/ 'a hobby'),

Some older compounds remain initial-accented: aisatsu (挨拶; /áisatsɯ/ 'greeting'), unmei (運命; /ɯ́Nmei/ 'one's destiny'), ōjō (往生; /óRʑoR/ 'rebirth in Sukhavati'), kaishaku (介錯・解釈; /káiɕakɯ/ 'assistance in committing seppuku; an interpretation'), kaihō (介抱; /káihoR/ 'care'), kannin (堪忍; /káNniN/ 'patience'), kanben (勘弁; /káNbeN/ 'forgiveness'), kōkō (孝行; /kóRkoR/ 'filial piety'), (人類; /ʑíNɾɯi/ 'humankind'), Shinshū (信州; /ɕíNɕɯR/ 'Shinano Province'), Chōshū (長州; /cɕóRɕɯR/ 'Nagato Province'), etc.

Some Sino-Japanese and most native modifiers make their own last mora the nucleus:

- kokunai (国内; /kokɯ́-nai/ 'inside one's country'), sakujitsu (昨日; /sakɯ́-ʑitsɯ/ 'yesterday'), nikurui (肉類; /nikɯ́-ɾɯi/ 'meat'), etc.
- anibun (兄分; /aní-bɯN/ 'one's sworn elder brother'), toribun (取り分; /toɾí-bɯN/ 'one's share'), Edojō (江戸城; /edó-ʑoR/ 'Edo Castle'), (組員; /kɯmí-iN/ 'a yakuza member'), suzuran (鈴蘭; /sɯzɯ́-ɾaN/ 'a lily-of-the-valley'), tamazan (珠算; /tamá-zaN/ 'abacus calculation'), tashizan (足し算; /taɕí-zaN/ 'addition'), hikizan (引き算; /hi̥kí-zaN/ 'subtraction'), kakezan (掛け算; /kaké-zaN/ 'multiplication'), warizan (割り算; /waɾí-zaN/ 'division'), yadochin (宿賃; /jadó-cɕiN/ 'hotel charges'), etc.

==== Long compounds ====
Long compounds are more predictable, in that their accent largely correlates with their heads. Long accented compounds are generally penultimate-, antepenultimate- or preantepenultimate-accented (see also the statistics at #Nouns). As specified below, long compound nouns' accent reflects the following tendencies:

1. If a compound is to be accented, its nucleus should be as close to the boundary of its components as possible, ie either the modifier's last mora or the head's first mora.
2. If a compound is to be accented, its nucleus should be as close to the antepenultimate mora as possible, as per the antepenultimate rule.

These two tendencies can cooccur, or override one another and result in variant locations for nuclei.

===== Short heads =====
The head can be preaccenting, deaccenting or retain its original accent.

- Preaccenting short heads:
  - midori + ko → midorigo (緑+子→緑児; 'green + a child → an infant'): /mídoɾi + ko → midoɾí-ɡo/
  - nawashiro + ta → nawashiroda (苗代+田→苗代田; 'a rice bed + a paddy → a rice bed'): /nawaɕiɾo + tá → nawaɕiɾó-da/
  - nokori + hi → nokoribi (残り+火→残り火; 'remaining + fire → embers'): /nokóɾi + hi → nokoɾí-bi/
  - yokka + ichi → Yokkaichi (四日+市→四日市; 'four days; fourth day + a market → Yokkaichi'): /joQka + ícɕi → joQká-icɕi/
  - Akita + inu → Akitainu (秋田+犬→秋田犬; 'Akita + a dog → an Akita Inu'): /áki̥ta + inɯ́ → aki̥tá-inɯ ~ aki̥ta-inɯ/
  - taue + uta → taueuta (田植え+歌→田植え歌; 'rice planting + a song → a rice-planting song'): /taɯé + ɯtá → taɯé-ɯta/
  - Shinano + kawa → Shinanogawa (信濃+川→信濃川; 'Shinano + a river → the Shinano River'): /ɕínano ~ ɕinanó + kawá → ɕinanó-ɡawa/
  - Rain + kawa → Raingawa (ライン+川→ライン川; 'Rhine + a river → the Rhine'): /ɾáiN + kawá → ɾaíN-ɡawa/
  - Supein + kaze → Supeinkaze (スペイン+風邪→スペイン風邪; 'Spain + flu → Spanish flu'): /sɯ̥péiN + kaze → sɯ̥peíN-kaze/
  - geka + ‑i → gekai (外科+医→外科医; 'surgery + a physician → a surgeon'): /ɡeka + í → ɡeká-i/
  - denwa + ‑ki → denwaki (電話+機→電話機; '"electric speech" + a machine → a telephone'): /deNwa + kí → deNwá-ki/
  - Ōsaka + ‑shi → Ōsakashi (大阪+市→大阪市; 'Osaka + a city → Osaka City'): /oRsaka + ɕí → oRsaká-ɕi/
  - Saitama + ‑ken → Saitamaken (埼玉+県→埼玉県; 'Saitama + a prefecture → Saitama Prefecture'): /sáitama + kéN → saitamá-keN/
  - Ueno + ‑eki → Uenoeki (上野+駅→上野駅; 'Ueno + a train station → Ueno Station'): /ɯeno + éki → ɯenó-eki/
  - dōbutsu + ‑gaku → dōbutsugaku (動物+学→動物学; 'an animal + an academic discipline → zoology'): /doRbutsɯ + ɡakɯ ~ ɡákɯ → doRbɯtsɯ́-ɡakɯ/
  - terebi + ‑kyoku → terebikyoku (テレビ+局→テレビ局; 'TV + a broadcasting station → a TV station'): /téɾebi + kjókɯ → teɾebí-kjokɯ/
- Deaccenting short heads:
  - undō + ba ~ ‑jō → undōba ~ undōjō (運動+場→運動場; 'exercise + a ground → a playground'): /ɯNdoR + ba ~ ʑóR → ɯNdoR-ba ~ ɯNdoR-ʑoR/
  - tamago + kata → tamagogata (卵+形→卵形; 'an egg + a shape → an egg shape'): /tamáɡo ~ tamaɡo + katá → tamaɡo-ɡata/
  - Satsuma + imo → Satsumaimo (薩摩+芋→薩摩芋; 'Satsuma + a potato → a sweet potato'): /sátsɯma ~ satsɯmá + imó → satsɯma-imo/
  - Nihon + kami → Nihongami (日本+髪→日本髪; 'Japan + hair → a Japanese hairstyle'): /nihóN + kamí → nihoN-ɡami/
  - shabon + tama → shabondama (シャボン+玉→シャボン玉; 'soap + a ball → a bar of soap'): /ɕaboN + tamá → ɕaboN-dama/
  - shōni + ‑ka → shōnika (小児+科→小児科; 'an infant + a medical department → paediatrics'): /ɕóRni + ká → ɕoRni-ka/
  - ratai + ‑ga → rataiga (裸体+画→裸体画; 'a nude body + an artwork → a nude artwork'): /ɾatai + ɡá → ɾatai-ɡa/
  - Nihon + ‑go → Nihongo (日本+語→日本語; 'Japan + a language → Japanese'): /nihóN + ɡó → nihoN-ɡo/
  - Tōkyō + ‑ben → Tōkyōben (東京+弁→東京弁; 'Tokyo + a dialect → the Tokyo dialect'): /toRkjoR + béN → toRkjoR-beN/
  - Kannon + ‑kyō → Kannonkyō (観音+経→観音経; 'Avalokiteshvara + a sutra → the Avalokiteshvara Sutra'): /kaNnoN + kjoR → kaNnoN-ɡjoR/
  - raihai + ‑dō → raihaidō (礼拝+堂→礼拝堂; 'Buddhist service + a hall → a Buddhist chapel'): /ɾaihai + dóR → ɾaihai-doR/
  - reihai + ‑dō → reihaidō (礼拝+堂→礼拝堂; 'Christian service + a hall → a Christian chapel'): /ɾeihai + dóR → ɾeihai-doR/
  - Furansu + ‑sei → Furansusei (フランス+製→フランス製; 'France + making → made in France'): /ɸɯɾaNsɯ + séi → ɸɯɾaNsɯ-sei/
  - erupī + ‑ban → erupīban (LP+盤→LP盤; 'LP + a record → an LP record'): /eɾɯpíR + báN → eɾɯpiR-baN/
- Other short heads can be either preaccenting or deaccenting:
  - takara + shima → takarajima (宝+島→宝島; 'a treasure + an island → a treasure island'): /takaɾá + ɕimá → takaɾa-ʑima/
  - hachijō + shima → Hachijōjima (八丈+島→八丈島; 'eight zhàng + an island → Hachijō Island'): /hacɕíʑoR ~ hácɕiʑoR + ɕimá → hacɕiʑóR-ʑima/
  - ukiyo + ‑e → ukiyoe (浮世+絵→浮世絵; 'floating world + a painting → a floating-world painting'): /ɯkíjo ~ ɯ́kijo ~ ɯkijo + é → ɯkijo-e ~ ɯkijó-e/
  - kan'i + ‑ka → kan'ika (簡易+化→簡易化; 'simplicity + ‑ification → simplification'): /kaNi ~ káNi + ká → kaNi-ka ~ kaNí-ka/
  - kango + ‑nin → kangonin (看護+人→看護人; 'nursing + a worker → a nurse'): /káNɡo + níN → kaNɡo-niN ~ kaNɡó-niN/
  - anzen + ‑ben → anzenben (安全+弁→安全弁; 'safety + a valve → a safety valve'): /aNzeN + béN → aNzéN-beN ~ aNzeN-beN/
- Some short initial-accented native words retain their accent as heads:
  - aiai + kasa → aiaigasa (相合い+傘→相合い傘; 'together + an umbrella → a shipping umbrella'): /aiai + kása → aiai-ɡása/
  - shuppatsu + mae → shuppatsumae (出発+前→出発前; 'departure + before → before departure'): /ɕɯ̥Qpatsɯ + máe → ɕɯ̥Qpatsɯ-máe/
  - musume + muko → musumemuko (娘+婿→娘婿; 'a daughter + a groom → a son-in-law'): /mɯsɯmé + mɯ́ko → mɯsɯme-mɯ́ko/

====== Some exceptional short heads ======
Mono (物・者; /monó/ 'a thing; a person') tends to be deaccenting or final-accented, but sometimes also initial-accented:

- takara + mono → takaramono (宝+物→宝物; 'treasure + a thing → treasure'): /takaɾá + monó → takaɾa-mono ~ takaɾa-monó ~ takaɾa-móno/
- yakkai + mono → yakkaimono (厄介+者→厄介者; 'a nuisance + a person → a nuisance person'): /jáQkai + monó → jaQkai-mono ~ jaQkai-monó ~ jaQkai-móno/

The suffixal head ‑kko (っ子; 'a person; a child') can be deaccenting, preaccenting or sometimes final-accented. When it is preaccenting, the accent does not usually shift even if it is on a special mora (see Japanese pitch accent § Accent shifts for more details):

- Deaccenting: Edokko (江戸っ子; /edo-Qko/ 'an Edoite'), kagikko (鍵っ子; /kaɡi-Qko/ 'a latchkey kid'), suekko (末っ子; /sɯe-Qko/ 'the youngest child'), tochikko (土地っ子; /tocɕi̥-Qko/ 'a native'), urekko (売れっ子; /ɯɾe-Qko/ 'a person in high demand'), (苛めっ子; /iʑime-Qko/ 'a bully'), etc.
- Preaccenting and accenting autonomous morae: dadakko (駄々っ子; /dadá-Qko/ 'a spoilt child'), musumekko (娘っ子; /mɯsɯmé-Qko/ 'a slip of a girl'), hitorikko (一人っ子; /hi̥toɾí-Qko/ 'an only child'), hayarikko (流行りっ子; /hajaɾí-Qko/ 'a much sought-after person'), nikumarekko (憎まれっ子; /nikɯmaɾé-Qko/ 'a naughty boy'), etc.
- Preaccenting and accenting special morae: gendaikko (現代っ子; /ɡeNdai-Qko ~ ɡeNdaí-Qko/ 'one of the kids these days'), Sendaikko (仙台っ子; /seNdaíQko/ 'a Sendaian'), Tōkyōkko (東京っ子; /toRkjoŔQko/ 'a Tokyoite'), Rondonkko (ロンドンっ子; /ɾoNdoŃQko/ 'a Londoner'), etc.
- Deaccenting or preaccenting:
  - amakko (尼っ子; /amá-Qko ~ ama-Qko/ 'a wench'), onikko (鬼っ子; /oní-Qko ~ oni-Qko/ 'a child who doesn't resemble their parents'), hizokko (秘蔵っ子; /hizo-Qko ~ hizó-Qko ~ hizoR-Qko/ 'one's pride and joy'), itazurakko (悪戯っ子・悪戯っ児; /itazɯɾá-Qko ~ itazɯɾa-Qko/ 'a little rascal'), (甘えっ子; /amae-Qko ~ amaé-Qko/ 'a clinging child'), moyashikko (萌やしっ子; /mojaɕí̥-Qko ~ mojaɕi̥-Qko/ 'an overprotected child'), etc.
- Final-accented: nekko (根っ子; /ne-Qkó/ 'a root'), (小僧っ子; /kozo-Qkó/ 'a youngster'), etc.
- Deaccenting, preaccenting or final-accented: kubinekko (首根っ子; /kɯbiné-Qko ~ kɯbine-Qkó ~ kɯbine-Qko/ 'the scruff of the neck'), etc.

The suffixal heads ‑sho/‑jo (所; 'a place') and ‑sho (書; /ɕó/ 'a document') tend to be deaccenting or final-accented:

- insatsusho (印刷所; /iNsatsɯ̥-ɕo ~ iNsatsɯ̥-ɕó/ 'a printing office'), kaigisho (会議所; /kaiɡi-ɕo ~ kaiɡi-ɕó/ 'a meeting place'), kumonjo (公文所; /kɯmoN-ʑo ~ kɯmoN-ʑó/ 'a feudal Japanese office for handling official documents'), kōmusho (公務所; /koRmɯ-ɕo ~ koRmɯ-ɕó/ 'a government office'), saibansho (裁判所; /saibaN-ɕo ~ saibaN-ɕó/ 'a courthouse'), shikenjo (試験所; /ɕi̥keN-ʑo ~ ɕi̥keN-ʑó/ 'a laboratory'), hoikusho ~ hoikujo (保育所; /hoikɯ̥-ɕo ~ hoikɯ̥-ɕó ~ hoikɯ-ʑo ~ hoikɯ-ʑó/ 'a daycare center'), torihikijo (取引所; /toɾihi̥ki-ʑo ~ toɾihi̥ki-ʑó/ 'a stock market'), etc.
- josansho ~ josanjo (助産所; /ʑosaN-ɕo ~ ʑosan-ʑo/ 'a maternity home'), takurōsho (宅老所; /takɯɾoR-ɕo/ 'an nursing home'), taihijo (待避所; /taihi-ʑo/ 'a layby'), datsuijo (脱衣所; /datsɯi-ʑo/ 'a dressing room'), reiansho (冷暗所; /ɾeiaN-ɕo/ 'a cool and dark place'), etc.
- ryōshūsho (領収書; /ɾjoRɕɯR-ɕo ~ ɾjoRɕɯR-ɕó/ 'a receipt'), mōshikomisho (申込書; /moRɕi̥komi-ɕo ~ moRɕi̥komi-ɕó/ 'a written application'), mitsumorisho (見積もり書; /mitsɯmoɾi-ɕo ~ mitsɯmoɾi-ɕó/ 'a written estimate'), etc.
- kōteisho (公定書; /koRtei-ɕo/ 'a codex'), senseisho (宣誓書; /seNsei-ɕo/ 'a written oath'), hanketsusho (判決書; /haNketsɯ̥-ɕo/ 'a judgement document'), wakansho (和漢書; /wakaN-ɕo/ 'Japanese and Chinese books'), hijunsho (批准書; /hiʑɯN-ɕo/ 'a ratification instrument'), etc.
- But:
  - jimusho (事務所・寺務所; /ʑimɯ́-ɕo/ 'an office; a Buddhist temple's office'), shamusho (社務所; /ɕamɯ́-ɕo ~ ɕamɯ-ɕo/ 'a Shinto shrine's office'), keimusho (刑務所; /keimɯ́-ɕo ~ keimɯ-ɕo ~ keimɯ-ɕó/ 'a prison')
  - genjūsho (現住所; /ɡeNʑɯ́R-ɕo/ 'one's present address'), daibenjo (大便所; /daibéN-ʑo ~ daibeN-ʑo/ 'a defecation restroom')
  - kyōkasho (教科書; /kjoRká-ɕo/ 'a textbook'), shuisho (趣意書; /ɕɯí-ɕo ~ ɕɯi-ɕó ~ ɕɯi-ɕo/ 'a prospectus'), todokesho (届け書; /todoke-ɕo ~ todoke-ɕó ~ todoké-ɕo/ 'a notice')
  - Kadensho (花伝書; /kadeN-ɕo ~ kadéN-ɕo/)

The suffixal head ‑ji (寺; 'a Buddhist temple') may be deaccenting or final-accented, but the modifier, which would be a temple's actual name, may also bear accent:

- kokubunji ~ Kokubunji (国分寺; /kokɯbɯN-ʑi ~ kokɯbɯN-ʑí/ 'a provincial temple ~ Kokubunji'), Gokokuji (護国寺; /ɡokokɯ-ʑi ~ ɡokokɯ-ʑí/ 'the Gokoku Temple'), etc.
- Engakuji (円覚寺; /éNɡakɯ-ʑi/ 'the Engaku Temple'), Kinkakuji (金閣寺; /kíNkakɯ-ʑi/ 'the Kinkaku Temple'), Ginkakuji (銀閣寺; /ɡíNkakɯ-ʑi/ 'the Ginkaku Temple'), Kōfukuji (興福寺; /kóRɸɯ̥kɯ-ʑi/ 'the Kōfuku Temple'), Zenkōji (善光寺; /zéNkoR-ʑi/ 'the Zenkō Temple'), Zentsūji (善通寺; /zéNtsɯR-ʑi/ 'the Zentsū Temple; Zentsūji'), Zōjōji (増上寺; /zóʑoR-ʑi/ 'the Zōjō Temple'), Chūsonji (中尊寺; /cɕɯ́RsoN-ʑi/ 'the Chūson Temple'), Nanzenji (南禅寺; /náNzeN-ʑi/ 'the Nanzen Temple'), Rokuonji (鹿苑寺; /ɾókɯoN-ʑi/ 'the Rokuon Temple'), etc.
- Tsukiji Honganji (築地本願寺; /tsɯ̥kiʑi-hóNɡaN-ʑi/ 'the Tsukiji Hongan Temple'), Higashihonganji (東本願寺; /hiɡaɕi-hóNɡaN-ʑi/ 'the Eastern Hongan Temple'), Nishihonganji (西本願寺; /niɕi-hóNɡaN-ʑi/ 'the Western Hongan Temple'), etc.
- Ninnaji (仁和寺; /niNna-ʑi ~ niNná-ʑi/ 'the Ninna Temple'), etc.
- Shuzenji (修禅寺・修善寺; /ɕɯzeN-ʑi/ 'the Shuzen Temple; Shuzenji'), etc.
- Tennōji (天王寺; /teNnóR-ʑi/), Tōshōdaiji (唐招提寺; /toRɕoRdái-ʑi/ 'the Tōshōdai Temple'), etc.

The suffixal head ‑san/‑zan (山; 'a mountain') is usually preaccenting, but the modifier, which would be a mountain's actual name, may also bear accent:

- Akagisan (赤城山; /akaɡí-saN/ 'Mount Akagi'), Kōyasan (高野山; /koRjá-saN/ 'Mount Kōya'), Hieizan (比叡山; /hiéi-zaN/ 'Mount Hiei'), Tennōzan (天王山; /teNnóR-zaN/ 'Mount Tennō'), etc.
- Fujisan (富士山; /ɸɯ́ʑi-saN/ 'Mount Fuji'), Naritasan (成田山; /náɾita-saN/), etc.

The suffixal head ‑jin (人; /ʑíN/ 'a person') is usually preaccenting, but sometimes also initial-accented after /N/:

- gaikokujin (外国人; /ɡaikokɯ́-ʑiN/ 'a foreigner'), Kankokujin (韓国人; /kaNkokɯ́-ʑiN/ 'a Korean'), Chūgokujin (中国人; /cɕɯRɡokɯ́-ʑiN/ 'a Chinese person'), Doitsu (ドイツ人; /doitsɯ́-ʑiN/ 'a German'), Amerikajin (アメリカ人; /ameɾiká-ʑiN/ 'an American'), Furansujin (フランス人; /ɸɯɾaNsɯ́-ʑiN/ 'a French person'), etc.
- shizenjin (自然人; /ɕizéN-ʑiN/ 'a natural person'), daionjin (大恩人; /daióN-ʑiN/ 'a magnanimous benefactor'), minkanjin (民間人; /miNkáN-ʑiN/ 'a civilian'), Shokusanjin (蜀山人; /ɕokɯ̥sáN-ʑiN/), Supeinjin (スペイン人; /sɯ̥peíN-ʑiN/ 'a Spaniard'), Norumanjin (ノルマン人; /noɾɯmáN-ʑiN/ 'a Norman'), Pashutunjin (パシュトゥン人; /paɕɯ̥tɯ́N-ʑiN/ 'a Pashtun'), Kuromanyonjin (クロマニョン人; /kɯɾomanjóN-ʑiN/ 'a Cro-Magnon'), etc.
- But:
  - Dēnjin (デーン人; /déRN-ʑiN/ 'a Dane')
  - yabanjin (野蛮人; /jabaN-ʑíN/ 'a barbarian'), nanbanjin (南蛮人; /naNbaN-ʑíN ~ naNbáN-ʑiN/ 'one of the Nanman ~ an Iberian during the Nanban trade'), Nihonjin ~ Nipponjin (日本人; /nihoN-ʑíN ~ niQpoN-ʑíN/ 'a Japanese person'), ippanjin (一般人; /iQpáN-ʑiN ~ iQpaN-ʑíN/ 'an everyman'), dōkenji (同県人; /doRkéN-ʑiN ~ doRkeN-ʑíN/ 'a person from the same prefecture')

===== Long heads =====
If the head is originally unaccented, or final- or initial-accented, or medially penultimate-accented with a special final mora, its first syllable tend to be accented in the compound:

- Originally unaccented long heads:
  - tsubaki + abura → tsubakiabura (椿+油→椿油; 'camellia + oil → camellia oil'): /tsɯ́baki + abɯɾa → tsɯbaki-ábɯɾa/
  - shiro + usagi → shirousagi (白+兎→白兎; 'white + a hare → a white hare'): /ɕíɾo + ɯsaɡi → ɕiɾo-ɯ́saɡi/
  - rōdō + kumiai → rōdō kumiai (労働+組合→労働組合; 'labor + a union → a labor union'): /ɾoRdoR + kɯmiai → ɾoRdoR kɯ́miai/
  - otoko + tomodachi → otokotomodachi (男+友達→男友達; 'a male person + a friend → a male friend; a boyfriend'): /otokó + tomodacɕi → otoko-tómodacɕi/
  - senkyo + undō → senkyo undō (選挙+運動→選挙運動; 'an election + a campaign → an election campaign'): /séNkjo + ɯNdoR → seNkjo ɯ́NdoR/
  - akusento + jiten → akusento jiten (アクセント+辞典→アクセント辞典; 'accent + a dictionary → a pitch-accent dictionary'): /ákɯ̥seNto + ʑiteN → akɯ̥seNto ʑíteN/
- But if the head is unaccented and quinquemoraic or longer, the nucleus may be the (pre)antepenultimate mora instead:
  - kuromitsu + tokoroten → kuromitsu tokoroten (黒蜜+心太→黒蜜心太): /kɯɾomitsɯ + tokoɾoteN → kɯɾomitsɯ̥ tokoɾóteN/
  - minami + Kariforunia → Minamikariforunia (南+カリフォルニア→南カリフォルニア; 'south + California → Southern California'): /minami + kaɾiɸoɾɯnia → minami-kaɾiɸóɾɯnia/
- Originally final-accented long heads:
  - ishi + atama → ishiatama (石+頭→石頭; 'rock + a head → pig-headedness'): /iɕí + atamá ~ atáma → iɕi-átama/
  - natsu + yasumi → natsuyasumi (夏+休み→夏休み; 'summer + a break → summer break'): /natsɯ́ + jasɯmí → natsɯ-jásɯmi/
  - kami + saiku → kamizaiku (紙+細工→紙細工; 'paper + a handicraft → a paper handicraft'): /kamí + saikɯ́ ~ saikɯ → kami-záikɯ/
  - kyū + shōgatsu → kyūshōgatsu (旧+正月→旧正月; 'old + the first month of the year → the first lunar month of the year'): /kjɯ́R + ɕoRɡatsɯ́ → kjɯR-ɕóRɡatsɯ/
- Originally medially penultimate-accented long heads with a special final mora:
  - kuni + sakai → kunizakai (国+境→国境; 'a country + a border → a frontier'): /kɯni + sakái → kɯni-zákai/
  - eigyō + annai → eigyō annai (営業+案内→営業案内; 'a business + a guide → a business guide'): /eiɡjoR + aNnái → eiɡjoR áNnai/
  - jisei + zairyō → jisei zairyō (磁性+材料→磁性材料; 'magnetism + material → magnetic material'): /ʑisei + zaiɾjóR → ʑisei záiɾjoR/
  - Ise + jingū → Ise jingū (伊勢+神宮→伊勢神宮; 'Ise + a shrine → the Ise Shrine'): /íse + ʑiNɡɯ́R → ise ʑíNɡɯR ~ ise ʑiNɡɯ́R/
  - kachi + handan → kachi handan (価値+判断→価値判断; 'a value + a judgement → a value judgement'): /kácɕi + háNdaN ~ haNdáN → kacɕi̥ háNdaN/
  - nyūsha + shiken → nyūsha shiken (入社+試験→入社試験; 'company entrance + an exam → an employment exam'): /njɯRɕa + ɕi̥kéN → njɯRɕa ɕí̥keN → njɯRɕa ɕi̥kéN/
- Originally initial-accented long heads:
  - tetsu + kabuto → tetsukabuto (鉄+兜→鉄兜; 'iron + a helmet → a steel helmet'): /tetsɯ + kábɯto → tetsɯ̥-kábɯto/
  - ie + kōmori → iekōmori (家+蝙蝠→家蝙蝠; 'a house + a bat → a house bat'): /ié + kóRmoɾi → ie-kóRmoɾi/
  - Yamato + tamashī → Yamatodamashī (大和+魂→大和魂; 'Yamato + a spirit → the Yamato spirit'): /jámato + támaɕiR → jamato-dámaɕiR/
  - nama + kashi → namagashi (生+菓子→生菓子; 'fresh + a sweet → a fresh sweet'): /náma + káɕi → nama-ɡáɕi/
  - jinbun + kagaku → jinbun kagaku (人文+科学→人文科学; 'humanism + science → the humanities'): /ʑiNbɯN + káɡakɯ → ʑiNbɯN káɡakɯ/
  - shakai + shugi → shakai shugi (社会+主義→社会主義; 'society + a doctrine → socialism'): /ɕákai + ɕɯ́ɡi → ɕakai ɕɯ́ɡi/
  - Kantō + chihō → Kantō chihō (関東+地方→関東地方; 'Kantō + a region → the Kantō region'): /káNtoR + cɕíhoR ~ cɕihóR → kaNtoR cɕíhoR → kaNtoR cɕi̥hóR/

Other originally medial-accented long heads tend to retain their accent:

- onba + higasa → onba higasa (乳母+日傘→乳母日傘; 'a wet nurse + a parasol → parental overprotectiveness'): /óNba + hiɡása → oNba hiɡása/
- yaki + hamaguri → yakihamaguri (焼き+蛤→焼き蛤; 'baking + an Asian hard clam → a baked clam'): /jaki + hamáɡɯɾi → jaki-hamáɡɯɾi ~ jaki̥-hamáɡɯɾi/
- Edo + murasaki → Edo murasaki (江戸+紫→江戸紫; 'Edo + purple → Edo purple'): /edo + mɯɾásaki → edo mɯɾásaki/
- hidari + uchiwa → hidariuchiwa (左+団扇→左団扇; 'left + an uchiwa → a comfortable life'): /hidaɾi + ɯcɕíwa → hidaɾi-ɯcɕíwa ~ hidaɾi-ɯ́cɕiwa/
- hoshi + tsukiyo → hoshizukiyo (星+月夜→星月夜; 'a star + a moonlit night → a starry moonlit night'): /hoɕi + tsɯ̥kíjo → hoɕi-zɯkíjo ~ hoɕi-zɯ́kijo/
- kankin + sakumotsu → kankin sakumotsu (換金+作物→換金作物; 'encashment + a crop → a cash crop'): /kaNkiN + sakɯ́motsɯ → kaNkiN sakɯ́motsɯ/
- jinsei + tetsugaku → jinsei tetsugaku (人生+哲学→人生哲学; 'human life + philosophy → the philosophy of life'): /ʑíNsei + tetsɯ́ɡakɯ ~ tetsɯɡakɯ → ʑiNsei tetsɯ́ɡakɯ ~ ʑiNsei tétsɯɡakɯ/

Some penultimate-accented long heads retain their accent despite ending in a special mora:

- ne + shōben → neshōben (寝+小便→寝小便; 'sleep + urination → bed wetting'): /ne + ɕoRbéN → ne-ɕoRbéN/
- kita + Chōsen → Kitachōsen (北+朝鮮→北朝鮮; 'north + Korea → North Korea'): /ki̥ta ~ ki̥tá + ɕoRséN → ki̥ta-cɕoRséN/
- nishi + Nihon → Nishinihon (西+日本→西日本; 'west + Japan → Western Japan'): /niɕi + nihóN → niɕi-nihóN/
- higashi + Nihon → Higashinihon (東+日本→東日本; 'east + Japan → Eastern Japan'): /hiɡaɕi ~ hiɡaɕí + nihóN → hiɡaɕi-nihóN/
- ura + Nihon → Uranihon (裏+日本→裏日本; 'the back side + Japan → Honshu's eastern coast'): /ɯɾá + nihóN → ɯɾa-nihóN/
- omote + Nihon → Omotenihon (表+日本→表日本; 'the front side + Japan → Honshu's western coast'): /omoté + nihóN → omote-nihóN/
- zen + Nihon ~ Nippon → zen Nihon ~ zen Nippon (全+日本→全日本; 'all + Japan → all Japan'): /zéN + nihóN ~ niQpóN → zeN-nihóN ~ zéN | nihóN ~ zeN-niQpóN ~ zéN | niQpóN/

====== Some exceptional long heads ======
Some heads become, or used to used to become, final-accented in long compounds. They have been regularized by later generations of speakers (the dagger ^{†} marks obsolete or obsolescent accent):

- kizu + kusuri → kizugusuri (傷+薬→傷薬; 'a wound + a drug → a vulnerary'): /kizɯ + kɯ̥sɯɾi → ^{†}kizɯ-ɡɯsɯɾí ~ kizɯ-ɡɯ́sɯɾi/
- mizu + kusuri → mizugusuri (水+薬→水薬; 'water + a drug → a liquid drug'): /mizɯ + kɯ̥sɯɾi → ^{†}mizɯ-ɡɯsɯɾí ~ mizɯ-ɡɯ́sɯɾi/
- mizu + kuruma → mizuguruma (水+車→水車; 'water + a wheel → a waterwheel'): /mizɯ + kɯɾɯma → ^{†}mizɯ-ɡɯɾɯmá ~ mizɯ-ɡɯ́ɾɯma/
- ishi + tatami → ishidatami (石+畳→石畳; 'stone + a tatami → stone paving'): /iɕí + tatami → ^{†}iɕi-datamí ~ iɕi-dátami/
- yaki + tōfu → yakidōfu (焼き+豆腐→焼き豆腐; 'broiling + tofu → broiled tofu'): /jaki + toRɸɯ ~ toRɸɯ́ → ^{†}jaki-doRɸɯ́ ~ jaki-dóRɸɯ/
- yaki + sakana → yakizakana (焼き+魚→焼き魚; 'broiling + fish → broiled fish'): /jaki + sakana → ^{†}jaki-zakana ~ jaki-zakana ~ jaki-zákana/
- ni + sakana → nizakana (煮+魚→煮魚; 'boiling + fish → fish boiled with soy'): /ni + sakana → ^{†}ni-zakana ~ ni-zakana ~ ni-zákana/

Some bimoraic Sino-Japanese heads are deaccenting when combining with short modifiers. When they combine with long modifiers, however, they tend to be preaccenting or regularly initial-accented instead:

Head	Deaccenting with a short modifier	Preaccenting or regularly initial-accented with a long modifier	Exceptions
isu (椅子; /isɯ/ 'a chair')	neisu (寝椅子; /ne-isɯ/ 'a napping chair'), nagaisu (長椅子; /naɡa-isɯ/ 'a long chair'), yuriisu (揺り椅子; /jɯɾi-isɯ/ 'a rocking chair'), etc.; zaisu (座椅子; /za-isɯ/ 'a zaisu'), tōisu (籐椅子; /toR-isɯ/ 'a cane chair')	kurumaisu (車椅子; /kɯɾɯmá-isɯ/ 'a wheelchair'), tatamiisu (畳み椅子; /tatamí-isɯ/ 'a folding chair'), hijikakeisu (肘掛け椅子; /hiʑikaké-isɯ/ 'an armchair'), etc.; hojo isu (補助椅子; /hoʑó isɯ/ 'a spare chair'), denki isu (電気椅子; /deNkí isɯ/ 'an electric chair'), anraku isu (安楽椅子; /aNɾakɯ́ isɯ/ 'an easy chair'), sankyaku isu (三脚椅子; /saNkjakɯ́ isɯ/ 'a three-legged stool'), etc.; kaiten isu (回転椅子; /kaitéN isɯ/ 'a swivel chair'), etc.	tōisu (籐椅子; /tóR-isɯ/ 'a cane chair')
deshi (弟子; /deɕí/ 'a disciple')	aideshi (相弟子; /ai-deɕi/ 'a fellow disciple'), anideshi (兄弟子; /ani-deɕi/ 'a senior disciple'), uchideshi (内弟子; /ɯcɕi-deɕi/ 'an apprentice who lives with their master'), magodeshi; matadeshi (孫弟子・又弟子; /maɡo-deɕi; mata-deɕi/ 'a disciple's disciple'), manadeshi (愛弟子; /mana-deɕi/ 'one's favorite disciple'); Butsudeshi (仏弟子; /bɯtsɯ-deɕi/ 'a disciple of the Buddha'), jikideshi (直弟子; /ʑiki-deɕi/ 'an immediate disciple'), shindeshi (新弟子; /ɕiN-deɕi/ 'a new disciple')	otōtodeshi (弟弟子; /otoRtó-deɕi/ 'a junior disciple'); shidaideshi (四大弟子; /ɕidái-deɕi/ 'the Buddha's four major disciples'), jūdaideshi (十大弟子; /ʑɯRdái-deɕi/ 'the Buddha's ten major disciples'), kyōdai deshi (兄弟弟子; /kjoRdái deɕi/ 'fellow disciples'), ichiban deshi (一番弟子; /icɕibáN-deɕi/ 'the best disciple')	anideshi (兄弟子; /aní-deɕi/ 'a senior disciple')
miso (味噌; /míso/)	akamiso (赤味噌; /aka-miso/ 'red miso'), shiromiso (白味噌; /ɕiɾo-miso/ 'white miso'), amamiso (甘味噌; /ama-miso/ 'sweet miso'), karamiso (辛味噌; /kaɾa-miso/ 'salty miso'), uomiso (魚味噌; /ɯo-miso/ 'fish miso'), taimiso (鯛味噌; /tai-miso/ 'bream miso'), kakimiso (牡蠣味噌; /kaki-miso/ 'oyster miso'), kanimiso (蟹味噌; /kani-miso/ 'crab miso'), komemiso (米味噌; /kome-miso/ 'rice-kōji miso'), mugimiso (麦味噌; /mɯɡi-miso/ 'barley-kōji miso'), mamemiso (豆味噌; /mame-miso/ 'soybean-kōji miso'), oni miso (鬼味噌; /oni-miso/ 'chili miso'), Edo miso (江戸味噌; /edo-miso/ 'Edo-style miso'), yuzu miso (柚味噌; /jɯzɯ-miso/), yakimiso (焼き味噌; /jaki-miso/ 'grilled miso'), kirimiso (切り味噌; /kiɾi-miso/ 'sliced miso'), taremiso (垂れ味噌; /taɾe-miso/ 'strained miso'), yowamiso (弱味噌; /jowa-miso/ 'a weakling'), kusomiso (糞味噌; /kɯ̥so-miso/ 'lumping miso in with crap ~ lumping the good in with the bad'), etc.	inaka miso (田舎味噌; /inaka míso/ 'barley-kōji miso'), temae miso (手前味噌; /temae míso/ 'self-praise'), awasemiso (合わせ味噌; /awase-míso/ 'mixed-type miso'), otoshimiso (落とし味噌; /otoɕi-míso/ 'whole-chunked miso'), Okazaki miso (岡崎味噌; /okazaki míso/ 'Okazaki-style miso'), etc.; horo miso (法論味噌; /hoɾo míso/), shōga miso (生姜味噌; /ɕoRɡa míso/ 'ginger miso'), sanshō miso (山椒味噌; /saNɕoR míso/ 'Japanese-pepper miso'), fukusa miso (袱紗味噌; /ɸɯ̥kɯsa míso/ 'mixed-type miso'), sannen miso (三年味噌; /saNneN míso/ 'third-year miso'), Saikyō miso (西京味噌; /saikjoR míso/ 'Kyoto-style miso'), Sendai miso (仙台味噌; /seNdai míso/ 'Sendai-style miso'), Shinshū miso (信州味噌; /ɕíNɕɯR míso/ 'Shinshū-style miso'), hatchō miso (八丁味噌; /haQcɕoR míso/ 'Okazaki-style miso'), Kinzanji miso (径山寺味噌; /kiNzaNʑi míso/ 'Jingshan-Temple miso'), etc.	yumiso (柚味噌; /jɯ-míso/ 'yuzu miso'), namamiso (生味噌; /nama-míso/ 'fresh miso'), uomiso (魚味噌; /ɯo-míso/ 'fish miso'), yuzu miso (柚味噌; /jɯzɯ-míso/), sumiso (酢味噌; /sɯ-míso/ 'vinegared miso'), namemiso (嘗め味噌; /name-míso/ 'main-dish miso'); nōmiso (脳味噌; /noR-míso/ 'brains'); goto miso (五斗味噌; /ɡoto miso/ 'five-ingredient miso'), goma miso (胡麻味噌; /ɡoma miso/ 'sesame miso'), horo miso (法論味噌; /hoɾo miso/)
moji (文字; /móʑi/ 'a written character')	kamoji (髪文字・髢; /ka-moʑi/ 'the character kami (髪; lit. 'hair') ~ a hairpiece'), yumoji (湯文字; /jɯ-moʑi/ 'the character yu (湯; lit. 'a bath') ~ a waist-wrapping bath cloth'), shinamoji (品文字; /ɕina-moʑi/ 'placement in the shape of the character shina (品; lit. 'an item')'), komoji (小文字; /ko-moʑi/ 'a small character'), ōmoji (大文字; /oR-moʑi/ 'a capital letter'), semoji (背文字; /se-moʑi/ 'text on a book spine'), oyamoji (親文字; /oja-moʑi/ 'a headword sinograph'), kana moji (仮名文字; /kana moʑi/ 'a kana character'), yokomoji; kanimoji (横文字・蟹文字; /joko-moʑi; kani-moʑi/ 'horizontal text'), karamoji (唐文字; /kaɾa-moʑi/ 'a sinograph'), hanamoji (花文字; /hana-moʑi/ 'an ornamental character ~ a character drawn with flowers'), hitomoji (人文字; /hi̥to-moʑi/ 'a character drawn with a human body'), marumoji (丸文字; /maɾɯ-moʑi/ 'a round-cornered character'), yubimoji (指文字; /jɯbi-moʑi/ 'fingerspelling'), yose moji (寄席文字; /jose moʑi/ 'the yose typeface'), iremoji (入れ文字; /iɾe-moʑi/ 'a character stylistically inserted into a waka'), aomoji (青文字; /ao-moʑi/ 'aromatic litsea'), kuromoji (黒文字; /kɯɾo-moʑi/ 'Lindera umbellata'), shiromoji (白文字; /ɕiɾo-moʑi/ 'Lindera triloba'); emoji (絵文字; /e-moʑi/ 'a pictogram'), kinmoji (金文字; /kiN-moʑi/ 'a gold character'), ginmoji (銀文字; /ɡiN-moʑi/ 'a silver character'), sōmoji (草文字; /soR-moʑi/ 'an East Asian cursive character')	ashide moji (葦手文字; /aɕide móʑi/ 'a Japanese character stylized as a picture'), otokomoji (男文字; /otoko-móʑi/ 'masculine handwriting ~ a sinograph'), onnamoji (女文字; /oNna-móʑi/ 'feminine handwriting ~ a hiragana'), kashiramoji (頭文字; /kaɕiɾa-móʑi/ 'a capital letter ~ an initial'), Yamato moji (大和文字; /jamato móʑi/ 'a kana'), yugamimoji (歪み文字; /jɯɡami-móʑi/ 'the hiragana with a bend, ku (く)'), etc.; kato moji (蝌蚪文字; /kato móʑi/ 'a tadpole character'), Joshin moji (女真文字; /ʑoɕiN móʑi/ 'a Jurchen character'), Mōko moji (蒙古文字; /moRko móʑi/ 'a Mongolian letter'), ketsujō moji (結縄文字; /ketsɯʑoR móʑi/ 'shorthand with rope knots'), ketsujō moji; kusabigata moji ~ kekkei moji ~ sekkei moji (楔状文字・楔形文字; /ketsɯʑoR móʑi; kɯ̥sabiɡata móʑi ~ keQkei móʑi ~ seQkei móʑi/ 'cuneiform'), Chōsen moji (朝鮮文字; /cɕoRseN móʑi/ 'hangul'), etc.; Girisha moji (ギリシャ文字; /ɡiɾiɕa móʑi/ 'a Greek letter'), Raten moji (ラテン文字; /ɾateN móʑi/ 'a Latin letter'), Kiriru moji (キリル文字; /kiɾiɾɯ móʑi/ 'a Cyrillic letter'), Ejiputo moji (エジプト文字; /eʑipɯ̥to móʑi/ 'an Egyptian hieroglyph'), Arabia moji (アラビア文字; /aɾabia móʑi/ 'an Arabic letter'), Fenekia moji (フェニキア文字; /ɸenikia móʑi/ 'a Phoenician letter'), Mongoru moji (モンゴル文字; /moNɡoɾɯ móʑi/ 'a Mongolian letter'), Burāfumī (ブラーフミー文字; /bɯɾaRɸɯmiR móʑi/ 'a Brahmi character'), Dēbanāgarī moji (デーバナーガリー文字; /deRbanaRɡaɾiR móʑi/ 'a Devanagari character'), etc.	komoji (こ文字; /ko-móʑi/ 'the character ko (こ) ~ a common carp (鯉, koi) ~ wheat (小麦, komugi)'), oyamoji (親文字; /oja-móʑi/ 'a headword sinograph'), kanimoji (蟹文字; /kani-móʑi/ 'horizontal text'), nawamoji (縄文字; /nawa-móʑi/ 'shorthand with rope knots'), hanamoji (花文字; /hana-móʑi/ 'an ornamental character ~ a character drawn with flowers'), yose moji (寄席文字; /jose móʑi/ 'the yose typeface'); emoji (絵文字; /e-móʑi/ 'a pictogram'), gomoji (五文字; /ɡo-móʑi/ 'five characters'), kanmoji (閑文字; /kaN-móʑi/ 'empty words'), kinmoji (金文字; /kiN-móʑi/ 'a gold character'), ginmoji (銀文字; /ɡiN-móʑi/ 'a silver character'); sumoji (す文字; /sɯ́-moʑi/ 'the character su (す) ~ sushi ~ surmise (推量, suiryō)'), memoji (目文字; /mé-moʑi/ 'the character me (目; lit. 'an eye') ~ an interview (目見え, memie)'), yumoji (湯文字; /jɯ́-moʑi/ 'the character yu (湯; lit. 'a bath') ~ a waist-wrapping bath cloth'), karamoji (唐文字; /kaɾá-moʑi/ 'a sinograph'), hitomoji (一文字; /hi̥tó-moʑi/ 'one character'), misohitomoji (三十一文字; /misohi̥tó-moʑi/ 'thirty-one characters'), futamoji (二文字; /ɸɯ̥tá-moʑi/ 'two characters'), kakimoji (書き文字; /kakí-moʑi/ 'handwriting'), Yamato moji (大和文字; /jamató moʑi/ 'a kana'), kuromoji (黒文字; /kɯɾó-moʑi/ 'Lindera umbellata'); shamoji (杓文字; /ɕá-moʑi/ 'the character shaku (杓; lit. 'a hishaku') ~ a rice paddle (杓子, shakushi)')

Isha (医者; /iɕa/ 'a physician') is preaccenting in several compounds:

- haisha (歯医者; /há-iɕa/ 'a dentist'), meisha (目医者; /mé-iɕa/ 'an oculist'), hariisha (鍼医者; /haɾí-iɕa/ 'an acupuncturist'), umaisha (馬医者; /ɯmá-iɕa/ 'an equine veterinarian'), teisha (手医者; /té-iɕa/ 'a retained physician'), taiko isha (太鼓医者; /taikó iɕa/ 'a sycophantic quack'), takenoko isha (筍医者; /takenokó iɕa/ 'a quack')
- But: machiisha (町医者; /macɕi-iɕa ~ macɕí-iɕa/ 'a general practitioner'), yabuisha (藪医者; /jabɯ-iɕa/ 'a quack')

===== Ambiguous boundaries =====
In some cases, the boundary between the modifier and head is difficult to parse, or can be parsed in two ways without altering the resulting accentuation:

- kankō + ‑ri → kankōri (官公+吏→官公吏; 'the national and local governments + a public official → a public official'): /kaNkoR + ɾí → kaNkóR-ɾi/
- kan‑ + kōri → kankōri (官+公吏→官公吏; 'the government + a public official → a public official'): /káN + kóRɾi → kaN-kóRɾi/
- bungaku + ‑bu → bungakubu (文学+部→文学部; 'literature + a faculty → the faculty of literature'): /bɯ́Nɡakɯ + bɯ́ ~ bɯ → bɯNɡakɯ́-bɯ/
- bun‑ + gakubu → bungakubu (文+学部→文学部; 'literature + a faculty → the faculty of literature'): /bɯ́N + ɡakɯbɯ ~ ɡákɯbɯ → bɯN-ɡákɯbɯ/
- genjū + ‑sho → genjūsho (現住+所→現住所; 'one's current residency + a place → one's current address'): /ɡeNʑɯR → ɡeNʑɯ́R-ɕo/ (Note: Note that the suffix ‑sho is more likely to result in unaccented or final-accented compounds.)
- gen‑ + jūsho → genjūsho (現+住所→現住所; 'current + one's address → one's current address'): /ɡéN + ʑɯ́Rɕo → ɡeN-ʑɯ́Rɕo/
- hiki + ‑geki → hikigeki (悲喜+劇→悲喜劇; 'joy and sorrow + drama → tragicomedy'): /{hí̥ki → hi̥kí} + ɡéki → hi̥kí-ɡeki/
- hi‑ + kigeki → hikigeki (悲+喜劇→悲喜劇; 'sorrow + comedy → tragicomedy'): /kíɡeki → hi̥-kíɡeki/
- kokubun + ‑gaku → kokubungaku (国文+学→国文学; 'Japanese literature + study → Japanese literature'): /kokɯbɯN + ɡakɯ ~ ɡákɯ → kokɯbɯ́N-ɡakɯ/
- koku‑ + bungaku → kokubungaku (国+文学→国文学; 'the country + literature → Japanese literature'): /bɯ́Nɡakɯ → kokɯ-bɯ́Nɡakɯ/

===== Non-compoundified compounds =====
The above compounds can be termed "compoundified compound nouns" (複合化複合名詞, fukugōka fukugō meishi), the "strongly compound group" (複合の強いグループ, fukugō no tsuyoi gurūpu), or "united words" (結合語, ketsugōgo). Accentually, they are single words and exist in single minor phrases; the original accent of the components does not surface. These are not the only type of compound; there exist compounds whose components are loosely connected as separable minor phrases; these can be termed "non-compoundified compound nouns" (非複合化複合名詞, hifukugōka fukugō meishi), the "weakly compound group" (複合の弱いグループ, fukugō no yowai gurūpu), or "linked words" (接合語, setsugōgo). The following are examples where the same heads result in different types of compound nouns:

Head	Compoundified	Non-compoundified
kōtai (交代; /koRtai/ 'change')	sedai-kōtai (世代交代; /sedai-kóRtai/ 'a change of generation')	shinkyū kōtai (新旧交代; /ɕíNkjɯR (|) koRtai/ 'a transition between old and new')
fumei (不明; /ɸɯmeR/ 'unknown')	yukue-fumei (行方不明; /jɯkɯe-ɸɯ́meR/ 'whereabouts unknown')	shōsoku fumei (消息不明; /ɕoRsokɯ̥ (|) ɸɯmeR/ 'whereabouts unknown')

A few proverbial examples with compoundified and non-compoundified variants:

- hehenonomoheji (へへののもへじ): /hehenóno (|) moheʑi ~ hehenono móheʑi ~ hehenono mohéʑi/
- aoki toiki (青息吐息; 'great distress'): /aoíki̥ (|) toiki ~ aoíki̥ | tóiki ~ aóiki̥ (|) toiki ~ aóiki̥ | tóiki ~ aoiki̥ tóiki/
- Shirakawa yofune (白河夜船; 'being fast asleep'): /ɕiɾákawa (|) joɸɯne ~ ɕiɾakawa jóɸɯne/
- jijō jibaku (自縄自縛; 'being hoist by one's own petard'): /ʑiʑoR (|) ʑibakɯ ~ ʑiʑoR ʑíbakɯ/
- jiyū jizai (自由自在; 'complete freedom'): /ʑijɯ́R (|) ʑizai ~ ʑijɯR ʑízai/
- anchū mosaku (暗中模索; 'groping in the dark'): /áNcɕɯR (|) mosakɯ ~ aNcɕɯR mósakɯ/
- uō saō (右往左往; 'running around like headless chickens'): /ɯ́oR | sáoR ~ ɯóR saoR ~ ɯoR sáoR/
- nenbyaku nenjū; nengara nenjū (年百年中・年がら年中; 'from year's end to year's end'): /néNbjakɯ neNʑɯR ~ néNbjakɯ | néNʑɯR ~ neNbjakɯ néNʑɯR; néNɡaɾa neNʑɯR ~ néNɡaɾa | néNʑɯR ~ neNɡaɾa néNʑɯR/

Non-compoundification is more likely if the modifier is the semantic object of the head:

- kakusa + zesei → kakusa zesei (格差+是正→格差是正; 'disparity + correction → disparity correction'): /kákɯ̥sa + zeseR → kákɯ̥sa (|) zeseR/
- jimusho + heisa → jimusho heisa (事務所+閉鎖→事務所閉鎖; 'an office + closure → office closure'): /ʑimɯ́ɕo + heisa ~ héisa → ʑimɯ́ɕo (|) heisa ~ ʑimɯ́ɕo | héisa/

In some cases, the compoundified accent has a more static meaning, while the non-compoundified accent has a more dynamic meaning:

- jikō genshō (人口減少):
  - /ʑiNkoR ɡéNɕoR/: 'a state in which the population's declining'
  - /ʑiNkoR | ɡeNɕoR/: 'a dynamic decline in population'
- kenryoku shūchū (権力集中):
  - /ʑiNkoR ɡéNɕoR/: 'a state in which power's being concentrated'
  - /ʑiNkoR | ɡeNɕoR/: 'a dynamic concentration of power'

And there are cases in which the compoundified accent is more limited in use. In the following example, the compoundified accent only applies to traffic stops, while the non-compoundified accent can be used more generally:

- ichiji teishi (一時停止; 'a temporary halt/stop'): /icɕíʑi | teiɕi ~ icɕiʑi téiɕi/
  - shukka ga ichiji teishi shita (出荷が一時停止した; 'the shipment was temporarily halted'): /ɕɯ̥Qka ɡa | icɕíʑi | teiɕi ɕi̥ta/
  - kuruma ga ichiji teishi shita (車が一時停止した; 'the car temporarily stopped'): /kɯɾɯma ɡa | icɕíʑi | teiɕi ɕi̥ta ~ kɯɾɯma ɡa | icɕiʑi téiɕi ɕi̥ta/

===== Compounds with long-compound-derived heads =====
A long compound can become a head for an even longer compound which is still compoundified as a single accentual word. The long-compound-derived head simply retains its own original accent:

- matsuyoi + kusa → matsuyoigusa → ōmatsuyoigusa (待宵+草→待宵草→大待宵草; 'the fourteenth night of the eighth lunar month + grass → a fragrant evening primrose → a large-flowered evening primrose'): /mátsɯjoi + kɯ̥sá → matsɯjói-ɡɯsa → oR-matsɯjói-ɡɯsa/
- gyōsei + {te + tsuzuki → tetsuzuki} → gyōsei tetsuzuki (行政+{手+続き→手続き}→行政手続き; 'administration + {a hand + continuation → procedure} → administrative procedure'): /ɡjoRsei + {té + tsɯzɯki → te-tsɯ́zɯki} → ɡjoRsei te-tsɯ́zɯki/
- Genji + {mono + katari → monogatari} → Genji Monogatari (源氏+{物+語り→物語}→源氏物語; 'Genji + {a thing + narration → a tale} → the Tale of Genji'): /ɡeNʑi + {monó ~ mono + kataɾi → mono-ɡátaɾi} → ɡeNʑi mono-ɡátaɾi/
- mame + {jidō → jidōsha} → mamejidōsha (豆+{自動→自動車}→豆自動車; 'a bean + {automatism → a car} → a minicar'): /mamé + {ʑidoR → ʑidóR-ɕa ~ ʑidoR-ɕa} → mame-ʑidóR-ɕa/
- kyōiku + {iin + ‑kai → iinkai} → kyōiku iinkai (教育+{委員+会→委員会}→教育委員会; 'education + {a committee member + a gathering → a committee} → a board of education'): /kjoRikɯ + iíN-kai → kjoRikɯ iíN-kai/
- denki + {kikan → kikansha} → denki kikansha (電気+{機関→機関車}→電気機関車; 'electricity + {a machine → a locomotive} → an electric locomotive'): /déNki + {kí̥kaN → ki̥káN → ki̥káN-ɕa} → deNki ki̥káN-ɕa/
- Tōkyō + {{gaikoku + ‑go → gaikokugo} + daigaku → gaikokugo daigaku} → Tōkyō Gaikokugo Daigaku (東京+{{外国+語→外国語}+大学→外国語大学}→東京外国語大学; 'Tokyo + {{a foreign country + a language → a foreign language} + university → a university of foreign languages} → Tokyo University of Foreign Studies'): /toRkjoR + {{ɡaikokɯ + ɡó → ɡaikokɯ-ɡo} + daiɡakɯ → ɡaikokɯɡo dáiɡakɯ} → toRkjoR ɡaikokɯ-ɡo dáiɡakɯ/
- sararī + man → sararī-man → yasu-sararī-man (サラリー+マン→サラリーマン→安サラリーマン; 'salary + a man → a salaryman → a humble salaryman'): /sáɾaɾiR + máN → saɾaɾíR-maN → jasɯ-saɾaɾíR-maN/
- shin + {Nihon + kami → Nihongami} → shinnihongami (新+{日本+髪→日本髪}→新日本髪; 'new + {Japan + hair → a Japanese hairstyle} → a modernized Japanese hairstyle'): /ɕíN + {nihóN + kamí → nihoN-ɡami} → ɕiN-nihoN-ɡami/
- denshi + {kenbi → kenbikyō} → denshi kenbikyō (電子+{顕微→顕微鏡}→電子顕微鏡; 'an electron + {illumining the minutiae → a microscope} → an electron microscope'): /déNɕi + {kéNbi → keNbi-kjoR} → deNɕi̥ keNbi-kjoR/
- katei + {saiban → saibansho} → katei saibansho (家庭+{裁判→裁判所}→家庭裁判所; 'a family + {a trial → a courthouse} → a family court'): /katei + {sáibaN → saibaN-ɕo ~ saibaN-ɕó} → katei saibaN-ɕo ~ katei saibaN-ɕó/
- eisei + {shiken → shikenjo} → eisei shikenjo (衛生+{試験→試験所}→衛生試験所; 'hygiene + {an experiment → a laboratory} → a hygienic laboratory'): /eisei + {ɕi̥kéN → ɕi̥keN-ʑo ~ ɕi̥keN-ʑó} → eisei ɕi̥keN-ʑo ~ eisei ɕi̥keN-ʑó/

Very long heads likely result in non-compoundified compounds, which need correct placement of minor breaks for the intended meanings:

- Ōsaka + {kanku + {kishō + dai → kishōdai} → kanku kishōdai} → Ōsaka Kanku Kishōdai (大阪+{管区+{気象+台→気象台}→管区気象台}→大阪管区気象台; 'Osaka + {a jurisdictional region + {meteorological conditions + a platform → a meteorological observatory} → a regional meteorological observatory} → the Osaka Regional Meteorological Observatory'): /oRsaka + {káNkɯ + {ki̥ɕoR + dái → ki̥ɕoR-dai} → kankɯ ki̥ɕoR-dai} → oRsaka | kankɯ ki̥ɕoR-dai/ (it is "the regional observatory in Osaka," not "the observatory in the Osaka region")
- {daisan + kanku → Daisan Kanku} + {kaijō + hoan + honbu → kaijō hoan honbu} → Daisan Kanku Kaijō Hoan Honbu ({第三+管区→第三管区}+{海上+保安+本部→海上保安本部}→第三管区海上保安本部; '{the third + a jurisdictional region → the third region} + {at sea + the preservation of public security + a headquarters} → a Coast Guard headquarters} → the Third Regional Coast Guard Headquarters'): /{dáisaN + káNkɯ → daisaN káNkɯ} + {kaiʑoR + hoaN + hóNbɯ → kaiʑoR hoaN hóNbɯ} → daisaN káNkɯ̥ | kaiʑoR hoaN hóNbɯ/ (it is "the headquarters in the third region," not "the third regional headquarters" as the English translation suggests)
- tanki + {kaigai + ryūgaku → kaigai ryūgaku} → tanki kaigai ryūgaku (短期+{海外+留学→海外留学}→短期海外留学; 'a short term + {overseas + studying abroad → overseas studies} → short-termed overseas studies'): /táNki + {káiɡai + ɾjɯRɡakɯ → kaiɡai ɾjɯ́Rɡakɯ} → táNki̥ | kaiɡai ɾjɯ́Rɡakɯ/
- Nihon + {rekishi + gakkai → rekishi gakkai} → Nihon Rekishi Gakkai (日本+{歴史+学会→歴史学会}→日本歴史学会; 'Japan + {history + an academic society → a history society} → the Japan History Society'): /nihóN + {ɾeki̥ɕi + ɡaQkai → ɾeki̥ɕi ɡáQkai} → nihóN | ɾeki̥ɕi ɡáQkai/
- Tōkyō + {sukai + tsurī → Sukaitsurī} → Tōkyō Sukaitsurī (東京+{スカイ+ツリー→スカイツリー}→東京スカイツリー; 'Tokyo + {the sky + a tree → Skytree} → Tokyo Skytree'): /toRkjoR + {sɯ̥kái + tsɯɾíR → sɯ̥kai-tsɯɾíR} → toRkjoR (|) sɯ̥kai-tsɯɾíR/

=== Verb-derived nouns ===
Nouns derived from the infinitives (連用形, ren'yōkei) of simplex verbs tend to be either accented or unaccented accordingly to the original verbs' accent; however, while verbal infinitives are minimally penultimate-accented, their derived nouns tend to be final-accented.

- maki (巻き; 'rolling → a roll'): /maki/
- kure (暮れ; 'getting dark → nightfall'): /kɯɾe/
- kachi (勝ち; 'winning → a win'): /kácɕi → kacɕí/
- oroshi (下ろし・卸し; 'lowering'): /oɾóɕi → oɾoɕí/
- ochi (落ち; 'falling → a fall'): /ócɕi → ocɕí/

In some cases, the final mora may be considered special, so the penultimate mora is accented instead, making the nouns sound identical to the infinitives.

- narai (習い; 'emulating → a custom'): /naɾái → *naɾaí → naɾái/
- kangae (考え; 'thinking → a thought'): /kaNɡáe → *kaNɡaé → kaNɡáe/

Some quadrimoraic nouns can alternatively be penultimate-accented or, among younger speakers, unaccented, despite the original infinitives.

- atsumari (集まり; 'gathering → a gathering'): /atsɯmáɾi → atsɯmaɾí ~ atsɯmáɾi ~ atsɯmaɾi/
- araware (現われ; 'expressing → an expression'): /aɾawáɾe → aɾawaɾé ~ aɾawáɾe ~ aɾawaɾe/

Some nouns have strayed semantically from their original verbs and become irregular.

- maki (巻き; 'rolling → a scroll; a volume'): /maki → máki/
- muki (向き; 'facing → a direction'): /mɯki → mɯ́ki/
- seki (塞き→関; 'blocking → a checkpoint'): /séki/
- suri (掏り→掏摸; 'pickpocketing → a pickpocket'): /sɯ́ɾi/
- sawagi (騒ぎ; 'being noisy → a noise'): /sawáɡi → sáwaɡi/
- kakari (係り→係; 'handling → a clerk'): /kakáɾi → kákaɾi/
- oroshi (下ろし・卸し→颪・卸し; 'lowering; selling wholesale → a wind blowing down from a high place; wholesale'): /oɾóɕi → óɾoɕi/

==== Short verbal-infinitive–verbal-infinitive compounds ====
Nouns derived from two short verbal infinitives tend to be unaccented, regardless of the original verbs' accent.

- torikeshi (取り消し; 'canceling → cancellation'): /toɾikeɕi ~ toɾikéɕi → toɾikeɕi/
- uridashi (売り出し; 'puts on sale → an opening sale'): /ɯɾidáɕi → ɯɾidaɕi/
- mikomi (見込み; 'expecting → expectation'): /mikomi ~ mikómi → mikomi/
- uketori (受け取り; 'receiving → a receipt'): /ɯketoɾi ~ ɯketóɾi → ɯketoɾi/
- shiai (為合い→試合; 'doing together → a contest'): /ɕiái → ɕiai/

==== Short noun–verbal-infinitive compounds ====
These compound nouns are formed with a short noun and a short verbal infinitive.

If the compound is trimoraic:

- If the noun is originally unaccented, the compound tends to be unaccented as well:
  - ka + yari → kayari (蚊+遣り→蚊遣り; 'a mosquito + killing → a mosquito-repelling fire'): /ka + jaɾi → ka-jaɾi/
  - ki + mochi → kimochi (気+持ち→気持ち; 'one's feelings + holding → a feeling'): /ki + mócɕi → ki-mocɕi/
  - chi + tome → chidome (血+止め→血止め; 'blood + stopping → an antihaemorrhagic'): /cɕi + tome → cɕi-dome/
  - ne + sage → nesage (値+下げ→値下げ; 'a price + lowering → a price reduction'): /ne + sáɡe → ne-saɡe/
  - ame + ni → ameni (飴+煮→飴煮; 'candy + boiling → boiled candy'): /ame + ni → ame-ni/
  - aji + mi → ajimi (味+見→味見; 'taste + seeing → tasting'): /aʑi + mí → aʑi-mi ~ aʑi-mí/
  - hito + de → hitode (人+出→人出; 'people + coming out → a turnout'): /hi̥to + dé → hi̥to-de/
- If the noun is originally accented, the compound tends to be final-accented:
  - te + tsuri → tezuri (手+釣り→手釣り; 'a hand + angling → handlining'): /té + tsɯɾi → te-zɯɾi ~ te-zɯɾí/
  - u + nomi → unomi (鵜+呑み→鵜呑み; 'a cormorant + swallowing → swallowing whole'): /ɯ́ + nómi → ɯ-nomí ~ ɯ-nomi/
  - su + tsuke → suzuke (酢+漬け→酢漬け; 'vinegar + pickling → vinegar pickling'): /sɯ́ + tsɯ̥ke → sɯ-zɯké ~ sɯ-zɯke/
  - ya + tate → yatate (矢+立て→矢立て; 'an arrow + erecting → a yatate'): /já + táte → ja-taté/
  - dō + ki → dōgi (胴+着→胴着; 'a torso + wearing → a padded undershirt'): /dóR + ki → doR-ɡí ~ doR-ɡi/
  - tsuki + mi → tsukimi (月+見→月見; 'the moon + viewing → moon viewing'): /tsɯ̥kí + mí → tsɯ̥ki-mí ~ tsɯ̥ki-mi/

If the compound is quadrimoraic:

- If the noun is originally unaccented, the compound tends to be unaccented, or sometimes final- or penultimate-accented:
  - kabe + nuri → kabenuri (壁+塗り→壁塗り; 'a wall + plastering → wall pastering'): /kabe + nɯɾi → kabe-nɯɾi/
  - yome + tori → yometori (嫁+取り→嫁取り; 'a bride + taking → bride taking'): /jome + tóɾi → jome-toɾi ~ jome-toɾí ~ jome-tóɾi/
  - kao + dashi → kaodashi (顔+出し→顔出し; 'a face + letting out → showing up'): /kao + dáɕi → kao-daɕi/
  - sake + nomi → sakenomi (酒+飲み→酒飲み; 'liquor + drinking → a drinker'): /sake + nómi → sake-nomí ~ sake-nómi/
  - mizu + age → mizuage (水+揚げ→水揚げ; 'water + unloading → unloading from a watercraft'): /mizɯ + aɡe → mizɯ-aɡe ~ mizɯ-aɡé/
  - kama + yude → kamayude (釜+茹で→釜茹で; 'an iron kettle + boiling → kettle boiling'): /kama + jɯ́de → kama-jɯde/
  - kane + ire → kaneire (金+入れ→金入れ; 'money + putting in → a purse'): /kane + íɾe → kane-iɾé ~ kane-íɾe/
- If the noun is originally final-accented, the compound tends to be final- or penultimate-accented:
  - toshi + yori → toshiyori (年+寄り→年寄り; 'age + approaching → an old person'): /toɕí + joɾi → toɕi-joɾí ~ toɕi-jóɾi/
  - mono + sashi → monosashi (物+差し→物差し; 'a thing + measuring → a yardstick'): /monó + sáɕi → mono-saɕí ~ mono-sáɕi/
- If the noun is originally initial-accented, the compound tends to be antepenultimate- or penultimate-accented:
  - hashi + oki → hashioki (箸+置き→箸置き; 'a chopstick + laying → a chopstick rest'): /háɕi + oki → haɕí-oki ~ haɕi-okí ~ haɕi-oki/
  - fune + nori → funanori (船+乗り→船乗り; 'a watercraft + boarding → a sailor'): /ɸɯ́ne + noɾi → ɸɯná-noɾi/
  - tane + tori → tanetori (種+取り→種取り; 'seed + taking → seed collection'): /táne + tóɾi → tané-toɾi ~ tane-tóɾi/
  - ame + furi → amefuri (雨+降り→雨降り; 'rain + ascending → rainfall'): /áme + ɸɯ́ɾi → amé-ɸɯɾi/
  - tako + age → takoage (凧+揚げ→凧揚げ; 'a kite + raising → kite flying'): /táko + aɡe → takó-aɡe ~ tako-áɡe/

==== Long noun–verbal-infinitive compounds ====
Either the noun or the verbal infinitive can be long in these compounds.

If the infinitive is short:

- If the noun functions as an adverbial to the infinitive, the compound tends to be unaccented, and rendaku often applies:
  - yome + iri → yomeiri (嫁+入り→嫁入り; 'a bride + coming in → coming in as a bride → marrying into a man's family'): /jome + iɾi → jome-iɾi/
  - muko + iri → mukoiri (婿+入り→婿入り; 'a bridegroom + coming in → coming in as a bridegroom → marrying into a woman's family'): /mɯko + iɾi → mɯko-iɾi ~ mɯko-iɾí/
  - aota + uri → aotauri (青田+売り→青田売り; 'a green paddy + selling → selling rice while the paddy's still green'): /aota + ɯɾi → aota-ɯɾi/
  - aota + kai → aotagai (青田+買い→青田買い; 'a green paddy + buying → buying rice while the paddy's still green'): /aota + kai → aota-gai/
  - Nishijin + ori → Nishijin'ori (西陣+織り→西陣織; 'Nishijin + weaving → weaving in Nishijin → Nishijin brocade'): /niɕíʑiN + óɾi → niɕiʑiN-oɾi/
  - sannin + kake → sanningake (三人+掛け→三人掛け; 'three people + seating → seating for three people'): /saNníN + káke → saNnin-ɡake/
  - shin'yō + kashi → shin'yōgashi (信用+貸し→信用貸し; 'credit + lending → lending on credit → a credit loan'): /ɕiNjoR + kaɕi → ɕiNjoR-ɡaɕi/
    - But: kōri + kashi → kōrikashi ~ kōrigashi (高利+貸し→高利貸し; 'high interest + lending → lending at high interest → usury'): /kóRɾi + kaɕi → koRɾí-kaɕi ~ koRɾí-ɡaɕi/
  - mijin + kiri → mijingiri (微塵+切り→微塵切り; 'a tiny piece + cutting → cutting into fine bits'): /miʑiN + kíɾi → miʑiN-ɡiɾi/
  - kuro + koge → kurokoge (黒+焦げ→黒焦げ; 'black + burning → burning to a crisp'): /kɯ́ɾo + kóɡe → kɯɾo-koɡe/
  - yoyaku + sumi → yoyakuzmi (予約+済み→予約済み; 'a reservation + being settled → being settled with a reservation → being reserved'): /jojakɯ + sɯ́mi → jojakɯ-zɯmi/
  - shichibu + tsuki → shichibuzuki (七分+搗き→七分搗き; '70% + hulling → hulling rice to 70%'): /ɕi̥cɕíbɯ + {tsɯ̥́ki → tsɯ̥kí} → ɕi̥cɕibɯ-zɯki/
  - satō + tsuke → satōzuke (砂糖+漬け→砂糖漬け; 'sugar + soaking → soaking in sugar → sugared food'): /satóR + tsɯ̥ke → satoR-zɯke/
  - ippon + tsuri → ipponzuri (一本+釣り→一本釣り; 'one pole + fishing → fishing with a pole and line'): /íQpoN + tsɯɾi → iQpoN-zɯɾi/
  - fukuro + toji → fukurotoji (袋+綴じ→袋綴じ; 'a pouch + binding → binding a book with "pouchy" folded sheets'): /ɸɯ̥kɯɾó + tóʑi → ɸɯ̥kɯɾo-toʑi ~ ɸɯ̥kɯɾó-toʑi/
    - But: tamago + toji → tamagotoji (卵+綴じ→卵綴じ; 'an egg + binding → mixing ingredients with an egg'): /tamáɡo ~ tamaɡo + tóʑi → tamaɡó-toʑi/
  - nijū + tori → nijūdori (二重+取り→二重取り; 'double + charging → charging twice → a double charge'): /niʑɯR + tóɾi → niʑɯR-doɾi/
  - kanro + ni → kanroni (甘露+煮→甘露煮; 'nectar + stewing → stewing in nectar → sweet stewing'): /káNɾo + ni → kaNɾo-ni/
  - gobō + nuki → gobōnuki (牛蒡+抜き→牛蒡抜き; 'greater burdock + pulling → pulling like a burdock → yanking'): /ɡoboR + nɯki → ɡoboR-nɯki/
  - uguisu + hari → uguisubari (鶯+張り→鶯張り; 'a Japanese bush warbler + spreading → flooring with wood that makes a noise like a bush warbler's cry'): /ɯɡɯ́isɯ + haɾi → ɯɡɯisɯ-baɾi/
  - mimizu + hare → mimizubare (蚯蚓+腫れ→蚯蚓腫れ; 'an earthworm + swelling → swelling in the shape of a worm'): /mimizɯ + haɾe → mimizɯ-baɾe/
  - doyō + hoshi → doyōboshi (土用+干し→土用干し; 'the dog days + airing → airing clothes during the dog days'): /dojoR ~ dojóR + hóɕi → dojoR-boɕi ~ dojoR-boɕí/
  - chawan + mushi → chawanmushi (茶碗+蒸し→茶碗蒸し; 'a chawan + steaming → steaming in a chawan'): /cɕawaN + mɯ́ɕi → cɕawaN-mɯɕi ~ cɕawáN-mɯɕi/
  - okonomi + yaki → okonomiyaki (御好み+焼き→御好み焼き; 'your liking + roasting → roasting to your liking'): /okonomi + jaki → okonomi-jaki/
  - yutō + yomi → yutōyomi (湯桶+読み→湯桶読み; 'a hot-water pail + reading → reading in the style of the word yutō'): /jɯtoR + jómi → jɯtoR-jomi/
  - jūbako + yomi → jūbakoyomi (重箱+読み→重箱読み; 'a jūbako + reading → reading in the style of the word jūbako'): /ʑɯRbako + jómi → ʑɯRbako-jomi/
  - But: dobin + shiki → dobinshiki (土瓶+敷き→土瓶敷き; 'an earthen teapot + laying out → laying out under a teapot → a teapot coaster'): /dobiN + ɕi̥ki → dobíN-ɕi̥ki/
- If the noun functions as a direct object to the infinitive, the compound tends to be accented on the noun's last mora, and rendaku does not often apply:
  - kusuri + uri → kusuriuri (薬+売り→薬売り; 'a medicine + peddling → peddling medicines → a medicine peddler'): /kɯ̥sɯɾi + ɯɾi → kɯ̥sɯɾí-ɯɾi/
  - yasumono + kai → yasumonokai (安物+買い→安物買い; 'a cheap item + buying → buying cheap goods → a bargain hunter'): /jasɯmono + kai → jasɯmonó-kai/
  - bōshi + kake → bōshikake (帽子+掛け→帽子掛け; 'a hat + hanging → hanging a hat → a hat stand'): /boRɕi + káke → boRɕí-kake/
  - chīzu + kiri → chīzukiri (チーズ+切り→チーズ切り; 'cheese + cutting → cutting cheese → a cheese cutter'): /cɕíRzɯ + kíɾi → cɕiRzɯ́-kiɾi/
  - abura + sashi → aburasashi (油+差し→油差し; 'oil + pouring → adding oil → an oilcan'): /abɯɾa + sáɕi → abɯɾá-saɕi ~ abɯɾa-sáɕi/
    - But: ichirin + sashi → ichirinzashi (一輪+挿し→一輪挿し; 'a single flower + inserting → inserting one flower → a single-flower vase'): /icɕíɾiN ~ icɕiɾiN + sáɕi → icɕiɾiN-zaɕi/
  - sakana ~ uo + tsuri → sakanatsuri ~ uotsuri (魚+釣り→魚釣り; 'a fish + fishing → fishing fish → fishing'): /sakana ~ ɯo + tsɯɾi → sakaná-tsɯɾi ~ ɯo-tsɯɾí ~ ɯo-tsɯ́ɾi ~ ɯo-tsɯɾi/
  - ninki + tori → ninkitori (人気+取り→人気取り; 'popularity + taking → seeking popularity'): /niNki + tóɾi → niNkí̥-toɾi/
  - kūki + nuki → kūkinuki (空気+抜き→空気抜き; 'air + extracting → extracting air → a ventilator'): /kɯ́Rki + nɯki → kɯRkí-nɯki ~ kɯRki-nɯki/
  - shōji + hari → shōjihari (障子+張り→障子張り; 'a shoji + covering → papering a shoji'): /ɕoRʑi + haɾi → ɕoRʑí-haɾi/
  - futon + hoshi → futonhoshi (布団+干し→布団干し; 'a futon + airing → airing a futon → a futon dryer'): /ɸɯ̥toN + hóɕi → ɸɯ̥tóN-hoɕi/
  - gohan + mushi → gohanmushi (御飯+蒸し→御飯蒸し; 'cooked rice + steaming → steaming rice → a rice steamer'): /ɡóhaN + mɯ́ɕi → ɡoháN-mɯɕi/
  - Rongo + yomi → Rongoyomi (論語+読み→論語読み; 'the Analects + reading → reading the Analects → an Analects reader → a Confucian'): /ɾoNɡo ~ ɾóNɡo + jómi → ɾoNɡó-jomi ~ ɾoNɡo-jomí/
  - But: tatami + shiki → tatamijiki (畳+敷き→畳敷き; 'a tatami + laying out → laying out a tatami'): /tatami + ɕi̥ki → tatami-ʑiki/

If the infintive is long, it tends to become initial-accented with rendaku in the compound. This coincides with the rules for modifier–long-head compounds as shown above; as previously mentioned, verbal-infinitive-derived nouns tend to be either unaccented or final-accented, which means that the infinitive/noun in this case tends to become initial-accented. However, not all infinitives have derived nouns; in the following, infinitive-derived nouns are not parenthesized, while mere infinitives are:

- uta + (utai) → utautai (歌+(歌い)→歌歌い; 'a song + (singing) → a singer'): /ɯtá + (ɯtai) → ɯta-ɯ́tai/
- fune + asobi → funaasobi (船+遊び→船遊び; 'a watercraft + play → boating'): /ɸɯ́ne + asobi → ɸɯna-ásobi/
- kodomo + atsukai → kodomoatsukai (子供+扱い→子供扱い; 'a child + treatment → treating like a child'): /kodomo + atsɯ̥kai → kodomo-átsɯ̥kai/
- me + (samashi) → mezamashi (目+(覚まし)→目覚まし; 'an eye + (waking up) → something to keep one's eyes open'): /mé + (samáɕi) → me-zámaɕi/
- oya + omoi → oyaomoi (親+思い→親思い; 'a parent + thought → filial affection'): /ojá + omói → oja-ómoi/
- baka + sawagi → bakasawagi (馬鹿+騒ぎ→馬鹿騒ぎ; 'a fool + noise → reveling commotion'): /báka + sáwaɡi → baka-sáwaɡi/
- oya + kakari → oyagakari (親+掛かり→親掛かり; 'a parent + being in charge → dependence on one's parents'): /ojá + kákaɾi → oja-ɡákaɾi/
- oya + (nakase) → oyanakase (親+(泣かせ)→親泣かせ; 'a parent + (causing to cry) → the bane of one's parents'): /ojá + (nakase) → oja-nákase/
- mono + (wasure) → monowasure (物+(忘れ)→物忘れ; 'a thing + (forgetting) → forgetfulness'): /monó + (wasɯɾe) → mono-wásɯɾe/
- hito + tasuke → hitodasuke (人+助け→人助け; 'other people + help → a kind deed'): /hi̥to + tasɯ̥ké → hi̥to-dásɯ̥ke ~ hi̥to-dasɯ̥ke/

==== Simplex-verbal-infinitive–short-noun compounds ====
These compound nouns are formed with a simplex verbal infinitive and a short noun.

If the infinitive is originally unaccented, the compound tends to be unaccented as well:

- ī + ne → īne (言い+値→言い値; 'saying + a price → the asking price'): /iR + ne → iR-ne/
- tsumi + kusa → tsumikusa (摘み+草→摘み草; 'picking + grass → herb gathering'): /tsɯmi + kɯ̥sa → tsɯmi-kɯ̥sa/
- tsugi + me → tsugime (継ぎ+目→継ぎ目; 'following + an eye → a seam'): /tsɯɡi + mé → tsɯɡi-me/
- kai + mono → kaimono (買い+物→買い物; 'purchasing + a thing → a purchase'): /kai + monó → kai-mono/
- ki + te → kite (着+手→着手; 'wearing + ‑er → a wearer'): /ki + té → ki̥-té ~ ki̥-te/
- age + soko → agezoko (上げ+底→上げ底; 'raising + a bottom → a raised bottom'): /aɡe + soko → aɡe-zoko/
- wasure + mono → wasuremono (忘れ+物→忘れ物; 'forgetting + a thing → a lost item'): /wasɯɾe + monó → wasɯɾe-mono/

If the infinitive is originally accented, its last mora tends to become the compound's nucleus:

- ami + to → amido (編み+戸→編み戸; 'braiding + a door → a braided door'): /ámi + to → amí-do/
- nomi + mizu → nomimizu (飲み+水→飲み水; 'drinking + water → drinking water'): /nómi + mizɯ → nomí-mizɯ/
- maki + e → makie (撒き+餌→撒き餌; 'scattering + bait → scattered bait'): /máki + é → makí-e/
- mochi + nushi → mochinushi (持ち+主→持ち主; 'holding + the owner → the owner'): /mócɕi + nɯ́ɕi → mocɕí-nɯɕi/
- kaki + mono → kakimono (書き+物→書き物; 'writing + a thing → a piece of writing'): /káki + monó → kakí-mono ~ kaki-móno/
- tsuke + ne → tsukene (付け+値→付け値; 'offering + a price → the offered price'): /{tsɯ̥́ke → tsɯ̥ké} + ne → tsɯ̥ké-ne/
- ike + hana → ikebana (生け+花→生け花; 'arranging flower + a flower → flower arrangement'): /íke + haná → iké-bana/

=== Adjective-derived nouns ===
Nouns derived from unaccented adjectival infinitives tend to be final-accented, while those from accented ones keep the original accent:

- tōku (遠く; 'being far → a distant place'): /toRkɯ → toRkɯ́/
- chikaku (近く; 'being near → a nearby place'): /cɕí̥kakɯ → cɕi̥kákɯ/
- furuku (古く; 'being old → days gone by'): /ɸɯ́ɾɯkɯ/

The accent of nouns derived from classical Japanese imperfect conclusives (終止形, shūshikei) correlates to their own mora counts: final-accented if bimoraic, unaccented if trimoraic.

- sushi (酸し→鮨; 'is sour → sushi'): /sɯ́ɕi → sɯɕí ~ sɯ́ɕi/
- omoshi (重し→重石; 'is heavy → a weight'): /omóɕi → omoɕi/
- karashi (辛し→芥子; 'is spicy → mustard'): /káɾaɕi → kaɾaɕi/

Bimoraic nouns that are also adjectival stems are initial-accented: ao (青; /áo/ 'grue'), aka (赤; /áka/ 'red'), kuro (黒; /kɯ́ɾo/ 'black'), shiro (白; /ɕíɾo/ 'white'), furu (古; /ɸɯ́ɾɯ/ 'a secondhand garment'), waka (若; /wáka/ 'a young master'), waru (悪; /wáɾɯ/ 'a bad person'), etc.

==== Short adjectival-stem–adjectival-stem compounds ====
These compounds, which consist of two short adjectival stems (語幹, gokan), tend to be unaccented: usuao (薄青; /ɯsɯ-ao/ 'faint blue'), usuaka (薄赤; /ɯsɯ-aka/ 'faint red'), tōasa (遠浅; /toR-asa/ 'a gently shelving shallow beach'), etc.

==== Noun–adjectival-stem compounds ====
Compounds with a short noun/verbal infinitive and an adjectival stem tend to be unaccented:

- Short adjectival stems: teusu (手薄; /te-ɯsɯ/ 'thinly manned'), hōjiro ~ hohojiro (頬白; /hoR-ʑiɾo ~ hoho-ʑiɾo/ 'a meadow bunting'), medaka (目高; /me-daka/ 'a fish of the genus Oryzias'), kowadaka (声高; /kowa-daka/ 'loud-voiced'), kinaga (気長; /ki-naɡa/ 'unhurried'), omonaga (面長; /omo-naɡa/ 'oval-faced'), hababiro (幅広; /haba-biɾo/ 'broad'), yokufuka (欲深; /jokɯ-ɸɯ̥ka/ 'greed'), etc.
- Long adjectival stems: kimijika (気短; /ki-miʑika/ 'short-tempered'), temijika (手短; /te-miʑika/ 'brief'), etc.

==== Short adjectival-stem–noun compounds ====
While these compounds consist of a short adjectival stem and a short noun, their accent actually correlates with the imperfect attributive realization of the stem. As noted above, when stems become nouns, they tend to be uniformly accented; their corresponding attributives, however, can be either unaccented or accented.

If the attributive is originally unaccented, the compound tends to be unaccented:

- akai + ke → akage (赤い+毛→赤毛; 'that is red + hair → red hair'): /akai + ke → aka-ɡe/
- akai + tsuchi → akatsuchi (赤い+土→赤土; 'that is red + soil → red soil'): /akai + tsɯ̥cɕí → aka-tsɯ̥cɕi/
- amai + sake → amazake (甘い+酒→甘酒; 'that is sweet + sake → sweet sake'): /amai + sake → ama-zake/
- amai + su → amazu (甘い+酢→甘酢; 'that is sweet + vinegar → sweetened vinegar'): /amai + sɯ́ → ama-zɯ/
- usui + me → usume (薄い+目→薄目; 'that is thin + an eye → half-closed eyes'): /ɯsɯi + mé → ɯsɯ-me/
- osoi + shimo → osojimo (遅い+霜→遅霜; 'that is late + frost → late frost'): /osoi + ɕimó → oso-ʑimo/

If the attributive is originally accented, the tri- or quadrimoraic compound tends to be accented on the stem's last mora. The quadrimoraic compound can also be unaccented:

- Trimoraic:
  - takai + ne → takane (高い+値→高値; 'that is high + a price → a high price'): /takái + ne → taká-ne/
  - kuroi + me → kurome (黒い+目→黒目; 'that is black + an eye → the iris and pupil'): /kɯɾói + mé → kɯɾó-me ~ kɯɾo-me ~ kɯ́ɾo-me/
  - shiroi + me → shirome (白い+目→白目; 'that is white + an eye → the sclera'): /ɕiɾói + mé → ɕiɾó me ~ ɕiɾo me ~ ɕíɾo-me/
  - waka + me (Note: This is a fossil word with no available modern accent.) → wakame (若い+海布→若布; 'that is young + kelp → wakame'): /wakái → waká-me ~ wáka-me/
- Quadrimoraic:
  - takai + nami → takanami (高い+波→高波; 'that is high + a wave → a high wave'): /takái + namí → taka-nami/
  - kuroi + shio → Kuroshio (黒い+潮→黒潮; 'that is black + a current → Kuroshio'): /kɯɾói + ɕió → kɯɾo-ɕio/
  - shiroi + uri → shirouri (白い+瓜→白瓜; 'that is white + a gourd → Oriental pickling melon'): /ɕiɾói + ɯ́ɾi → ɕiɾó-ɯɾi ~ ɕiɾo-ɯɾi/
  - shiroi + sagi → shirasagi (白い+鷺→白鷺; 'that is white + a heron → an egret'): /ɕiɾói + saɡi → ɕiɾa-saɡi/
  - wakai + kusa → wakakusa (若い+草→若草; 'that is young + grass → young grass'): /wakái + kɯ̥sá → waká-kɯ̥sa/
  - wakai + mono → wakamono (若い+者→若者; 'that is young + a person → a young person'): /wakái + monó → waka-mono/

=== Short adjectival-stem–verbal-infinitive and long verbal-infinitive−adjectival-stem compounds ===
These compounds tend to be unaccented:

- Short adjectival-stem–verbal-infinitive: usugi (薄着; /ɯsɯɡi/ 'lightly layered clothes'), usugiri (薄切り; /ɯsɯɡiɾi/ 'thin slicing'), kuronuri (黒塗り; /kɯɾonɯɾi/ 'black lacquering'), karuyaki (軽焼き; /kaɾɯjaki/ 'a cracknel'), tōmi (遠見; /toRmi/ 'a distant view'), hayade (早出; /hajade/ 'coming to work early'), (太巻き; /ɸɯ̥tomaki/ 'thick rolling'), etc.
- Long verbal-infinitive−adjectival-stem: nozomiusu (望み薄; /nozomi-ɯsɯ/ 'wanting of hope'), (気乗り薄; /kinoɾi-ɯsɯ/ 'unenthusiastic'), etc.

=== Dvandva compound nouns ===
Unlike modifier–head compounds whose components are connected by attribution, the components of dvandvas are connected by coordination. Dvandvas generally block rendaku.

==== Double dvandvas ====
The accent of a double dvandva tends to correlate with its first component. If the first component is originally unaccented, the compound tends to be (verbal infinitives, as well as verbal and adjectival forms with no derived nouns, are parenthesized):

- Unaccented:
  - ushi + uma → ushiuma (牛+馬→牛馬; 'a bovine + a horse → cattle and horses'): /ɯɕi + ɯmá → ɯɕi-ɯma/
  - eda + ha → edaha (枝+葉→枝葉; 'a branch + a leaf → branches and leaves'): /eda + ha → eda-ha/
  - sake + sakana → sakesakana (酒+肴→酒肴; 'liquor + a side dish → liquor and sides'): /sake + sakana → sake-sakana/
  - tori + kemono → torikemono (鳥+獣→鳥獣; 'a bird + a beast → birds and beasts'): /toɾi + kemono → toɾi-kemono/
  - nishi + higashi → nishihigashi (西+東→西東; 'west + east → east and west'): /niɕi + hiɡaɕi ~ hiɡaɕí → niɕi-hiɡaɕi/
  - momo + kuri → momokuri (桃+栗→桃栗; 'a peach + a chestnut → peaches and chestnuts'): /momo + kɯɾí → momo-kɯɾi/
  - teki + mikata → tekimikata (敵+味方→敵味方; 'a foe + an ally → friends and foes'): /teki + mikata → teki-mikata/
  - kesa + koromo → kesakoromo (袈裟+衣→袈裟衣; 'a kasaya + a robe → kasaya and robes'): /kesa ~ kesá + koɾomo → kesa-koɾomo/
  - age + oroshi → ageoroshi (上げ+下ろし→上げ下ろし; 'raising + lowering → raising and lowering'): /aɡe + oɾoɕí → aɡe-oɾoɕi/
  - uki + shizumi → ukishizumi (浮き+沈み→浮き沈み; 'floating + sinking → floating and sinking → the ups and downs ~ the highs and lows'): /ɯki + ɕizɯmi → ɯki̥-ɕizɯmi ~ ɯki̥-ɕízɯmi/
  - But: uchi + soto → uchisoto (内+外→内外; 'the inside + the outside → the inside and outside'): /ɯcɕi + sóto → ɯcɕi̥-sóto/
- Accented on the first component's last mora, especially if both components are originally verbal infinitives:
  - ushiro + mae → ushiromae (後ろ+前→後ろ前; 'back + front → back to front'): /ɯɕiɾo + máe → ɯɕiɾó-mae/
  - ue + shita → ueshita (上+下→上下; 'up ~ above ~ top + down ~ below ~ bottom → up and down ~ above and below ~ top and bottom'): /ɯe + ɕi̥ta → ɯé-ɕi̥ta/
  - age + sage → agesage (上げ+下げ→上げ下げ; 'raising + lowering → raising and lowering'): /aɡe + saɡé → aɡé-saɡe/
  - agari + (ori) → agariori (上がり+(下り)→上がり下り; 'ascending + (descending) → ascending and descending'): /aɡaɾi + (óɾi) → aɡaɾí-oɾi/
  - nori + (ori) → noriori (乗り+(降り)→乗り降り; 'boarding + (alighting) → boarding and alighting'): /noɾi + (óɾi) → noɾí-oɾi/
  - uri + kai → urikai (売り+買い→売り買い; 'buying + selling → buying and selling'): /ɯɾi + kai → ɯɾí-kai/
  - ne + (oki) → neoki (寝+(起き)→寝起き; 'sleep + (getting up) → lying down and getting up → living'): /né-oki/ (compare /ne-oki/ 'getting up from sleep')
  - ake + (tate) → aketate (開け+(閉て)→開け閉て; 'opening + (closing) → opening and closing'): /ake + (táte) → aké-tate/

If the first component is originally accented, it tends to keep that accent:

- chichi + haha → chichihaha (父+母→父母; 'a father + a mother → father and mother'): /{cɕí̥cɕi → cɕi̥cɕí} + háha → cɕícɕi̥ haha → cɕi̥cɕí-haha/
- jiji ~ jijī + baba ~ babā → jijibaba ~ jijībabā (爺+婆→爺婆; 'a grandpa + a grandma → grandpa and grandma'): /ʑíʑi ~ ʑiʑíR + bába ~ babáR → ʑíʑi baba ~ ʑiʑí baba ~ ʑiʑíR-babaR/
- Originally final-accented first component:
  - iro + koi → irokoi (色+恋→色恋; 'sex + love → love and sex'): /iɾó + kói → iɾó-koi/
  - kusa + ki → kusaki (草+木→草木; 'grass + a tree → trees and grass → vegetation'): /kɯ̥sá + kí → kɯ̥sá-ki/
  - tsuki + hi → tsukihi (月+日→月日; 'the moon ~ a month + the sun ~ a day → the sun and moon ~ days and months'): /tsɯ̥kí + hí → tsɯ̥kí-hi/
  - toshi + tsuki → toshitsuki (年+月→年月; 'a year + a month → months and years'): /toɕí + tsɯ̥kí → toɕí-tsɯ̥ki/
  - natsu + fuyu → natsufuyu (夏+冬→夏冬; 'summer + winter → summer and winter'): /natsɯ́ + ɸɯjɯ́ → natsɯ̥́-ɸɯjɯ/
  - hiru + yoru → hiruyoru (昼+夜→昼夜; 'day + night → day and night'): /hiɾɯ́ + jóɾɯ → hiɾɯ́-joɾɯ/
  - hone + kawa → Honekawa (骨+皮→骨皮; 'bone + skin → Skin and Bone'): /honé + kawá → honé-kawa/
  - hone + mi → honemi (骨+身→骨身; 'a bone + a body → flesh and bones'): /honé + mi → honé-mi ~ hone-mí ~ hóne-mi ~ hone-mi/
  - mago + ko → magoko (孫+子→孫子; 'a grandchild + a child → children and grandchildren'): /maɡó + ko → maɡó-ko/
  - yama + kawa → yamakawa (山+川→山川; 'a mountain + a river → mountains and rivers'): /jamá + kawá → jamá-kawa/ (compare /jama-ɡawa/ 'a river through the mountains')
  - teri + furi → terifuri (照り+降り→照り降り; 'sunshine + rainfall → rain or shine'): /teɾí + ɸɯɾí → teɾí-ɸɯɾi/
  - But: ura + omote → uraomote (裏+表→裏表; 'the back side + the front side → the front and back → the ins and outs'): /ɯɾá + omoté → ɯɾa-omote/
- Originally initial-accented first component:
  - aka + shiro → akashiro (赤+白→赤白; 'red + white → red and white'): /áka + ɕíɾo → áka-ɕiɾo/
  - asa + ban → asaban (朝+晩→朝晩; 'the morning + the evening → mornings and evenings'): /ása + baN → ása-baN/
  - ame + arare → amearare (雨+霰→雨霰; 'rain + hail → rain and hail'): /áme + aɾaɾe → áme (|) aɾaɾe/
  - ame + kaze → amekaze (雨+風→雨風; 'rain and wind'): /áme + kaze → áme kaze/ (compare /amá-kaze/ 'a rainy wind')
  - uji + sujō → ujisujō (氏+素性→氏素性; 'birth + breeding → birth and breeding'): /ɯ́ʑi + sɯʑoR → ɯ́ʑi-sɯʑoR/
  - umi + yama → umiyama (海+山→海山; 'the sea + a mountain → mountains and beaches'): /ɯ́mi + jamá → ɯ́mi-jama/
  - o + hire → ohire (尾+鰭→尾鰭; 'a tail + a fin → the tail and fins → embellishments'): /ó + hiɾé ~ hiɾe → ó-hiɾe/
  - kata + mi → katami (肩+身→肩身; 'a shoulder + a body → the body and shoulders → self-esteem'): /káta + mi → káta-mi/
  - kuro + shiro → kuroshiro (黒+白→黒白; 'black + white → black and white'): /kɯ́ɾo + ɕíɾo → kɯ́ɾo-ɕiɾo/
  - shiro + kuro → shirokuro (白+黒→白黒; 'white + black → the black and white of the eyes being rolled back and forth in shock ~ right and wrong'): /ɕíɾo + kɯ́ɾo → ɕíɾo-kɯɾo/
  - ta + hata → tahata (田+畑→田畑; 'a paddy + a field → fields and paddies'): /tá + hatá ~ háta → tá-hata/
  - te + ashi → teashi (手+足→手足; 'a hand + a foot → hands and feet'): /té + aɕí → té-aɕi/
  - tsuru + kame → tsurukame (鶴+亀→鶴亀; 'a crane + a tortoise → the crane and the tortoise → longevity'): /tsɯ́ɾɯ + káme → tsɯ́ɾɯ-kame/
  - haru + aki → haruaki (春+秋→春秋; 'spring + autumn → spring and autumn'): /háɾɯ + áki → háɾɯ-aki/
  - me + hana → mehana (目+鼻→目鼻; 'an eye + a nose → the eyes and nose → facial features ~ the correct shape'): /mé + hana → mé-hana/
  - mae + ushiro → maeushiro (前+後ろ→前後ろ; 'front + back → back to front'): /máe + ɯɕiɾo → máe-ɯɕiɾo/
  - yoru + hiru → yoruhiru (夜+昼→夜昼; 'night + day → night and day'): /jóɾɯ + hiɾɯ́ → jóɾɯ-hiɾɯ/
- Long dvandvas are more likely to behave as though they were modifier–head compounds:
  - ie + yashiki → ieyashiki (家+屋敷→家屋敷; 'a house + a mansion → houses and mansions'): /ié + jaɕi̥kí → ié-jaɕi̥ki ~ ie-jáɕi̥ki/
  - yume + utsutsu → yumeutsutsu (夢+現→夢現; 'a dream + wakefulness → half-dreaming and half-awake'): /jɯmé + ɯtsɯ̥tsɯ ~ ɯtsɯ̥tsɯ́ → jɯme-ɯtsɯ̥tsɯ ~ jɯmé-ɯtsɯ̥tsɯ ~ jɯme-ɯ́tsɯ̥tsɯ/
  - kage + hinata → kagehinata (陰+日向→陰日向; 'shade + a sunlit place → shade and sunlit places → acting one way or the other whether being watched'): /káɡe + hinata → káɡe-hinata ~ kaɡe-hínata/
  - kami + hotoke → kamihotoke (神+仏→神仏; 'a god + a buddha → gods and buddhas'): /kámi + hotoke ~ hotoké → kámi hotoke ~ kami-hótoke/
  - oyabun + kobun → oyabun kobun (親分+子分→親分子分; 'a boss + a henchman → a boss and their henchmen'): /ójabɯN ~ ojábɯN + kóbɯN → ojabɯN-kóbɯN/
  - giri + ninjō → giri ninjō (義理+人情→義理人情; 'obligation + humanity → humanity and obligation'): /ɡiɾí + níNʑoR → ɡiɾi-níNʑoR/
- Dvandvas of two verbs or adjectives, or a verb and an adjective, can also be accented on the first component's last mora:
  - (ari) + (nashi) → arinashi ((有り)+(無し)→有り無し; '(exists) + (is nonexistent) → presence and absence'): /(áɾi) + (náɕi̥) → áɾi-naɕi ~ aɾí-naɕi/
  - suki + kirai → sukikirai (好き+嫌い→好き嫌い; 'liking + hating → likes and dislikes'): /{(sɯ̥́ki) → sɯ̥kí} + kiɾai → sɯ̥kí-kiɾai ~ sɯ̥ki-kíɾai ~ sɯ̥ki-kiɾai/
  - dashi + (ire) → dashiire (出し+(入れ)→出し入れ; 'taking out + (putting in) → taking out and putting in'): /{(dáɕi) → daɕí} + (iɾe) → dáɕi-iɾe ~ daɕí-iɾe/
  - de + iri ~ (hairi) → deiri ~ dehairi (出+入り→出入り; 'getting out + getting in → getting in and out'): /dé ~ de + iɾi ~ (háiɾi) → de-iɾi ~ dé-iɾi ~ de-haiɾi ~ dé-haiɾi ~ de-háiɾi/
  - nomi + kui → nomikui (飲み+食い→飲み食い; 'drinking + eating → eating and drinking'): /{(nómi) → nomí} + {(kɯ́i) → kɯí} → nómi-kɯi ~ nomí-kɯi/
  - (mi) + (kiki) → mikiki ((見)+(聞き)→見聞き; '(seeing) + (hearing) → seeing and hearing → experience'): /(mí) + (ki̥ki) → mí-ki̥ki/
  - yomi + (kaki) → yomikaki (読み+(書き)→読み書き; 'reading + (writing) → reading and writing'): /{(jómi) → jomí} + (káki) → jómi-kaki ~ jomí-kaki/
  - taka + (hikui) → takahiku (高 + (低い) → 高低; 'high + (is low) → high and low → uneven'): /taká ~ táka + (hi̥kɯ́i) → taká-hi̥kɯ ~ táka-hi̥kɯ/
  - (yoshi) + (ashi) → yoshiashi ((良し)+(悪し)→良し悪し; '(is good) + (is bad/evil) → good and bad/evil'): /(jóɕi) + (áɕi) → jóɕi-aɕi ~ joɕí-aɕi/
  - But:
    - (aru) + (nashi) → arunashi ((有る)+(無し)→有る無し; '(exists) + (is nonexistent) → presence and absence'): /(áɾɯ) + (náɕi) → áɾɯ-naɕi/
    - shiro + kuro → shirokuro (白+黒→白黒; 'white + black → black and white in general ~ the black and white of pictures and films'): /ɕíɾo + kɯ́ɾo → ɕiɾo-kɯɾo/

Short Sino-Japanese dvandvas are generally initial-accented. Some of them work like the compounds with originally initial-accented first components listed above, but others only contain bound morphemes with no accent to speak of.

- With bound morphemes:
  - kyōdai (兄弟; /kjóR-dai/ 'elder and younger brothers → brothers → siblings'), keishi (兄姉; /kéi-ɕi/ 'elder brother and elder sister → elder siblings'), shitei (姉弟; /ɕí̥-tei → ɕi̥-téi/ 'elder sister and younger brother'), shimai (姉妹; /ɕí-mai/ 'elder and younger sisters → sisters'), sansui (山水; /sáN-sɯi ~ saN-sɯi ~ séN-sɯi/ 'mountains and waters'), fūu (風雨; /ɸɯ́R-ɯ/ 'wind and rain'), etc.
  - But: enkin (遠近; /eN-kiN/ 'far and near'), keimai (兄妹; /kei-mai/ 'elder brother and younger sister'), teimai (弟妹; /tei-mai/ 'younger brother and younger sister → younger siblings'), fūsetsu (風雪; /ɸɯR-setsɯ/ 'wind and snow'), etc.
- With free morphemes:
  - kin + gin → kingin (金+銀→金銀; 'gold + silver → gold and silver'): /kíN + ɡíN → kíN-ɡiN/
  - kō + otsu → kōotsu (甲+乙→甲乙; 'A + B → A and B → difference'): /kóR + ótsɯ → kóR-otsɯ/
  - ku + raku → kuraku (苦+楽→苦楽; 'pain + joy → pain and joy'): /kɯ́ + ɾakɯ́ → kɯ́-ɾakɯ/
  - jō + ge → jōge (上+下→上下; 'up ~ above ~ top + down ~ below ~ bottom → up and down ~ above and below ~ top and bottom'): /ʑóR + ɡé → ʑóR-ɡe/
  - shin + kyū → shinkyū (新+旧→新旧; 'new + old → old and new'): /ɕíN + kjɯ́R → ɕíN-kjɯR/
  - zen + aku → zen'aku (善+悪→善悪; 'good + evil → good and evil'): /zéN + ákɯ → zéN-akɯ ~ zéN-nakɯ ~ zéN-makɯ/
  - son + toku → sontoku (損+得→損得; 'loss + gain → loss and gain'): /sóN + tokɯ → sóN-tokɯ/
  - ten + chi → tenchi (天+地→天地; 'heaven + earth → heaven and earth'): /téN + cɕí → téN-cɕi/
  - ri + hi → rihi (理+非→理非; 'right + wrong → right and wrong'): /ɾí ~ ɾi + hí → ɾí-hi/
  - fu + ken → fuken (府+県→府県; 'fu and ken → Kyoto and Osaka, and other prefectures'): /ɸɯ́ + kéN → ɸɯ̥́-keN → ɸɯ̥-kéN/
  - chō + son → chōson (町+村→町村; 'a town + a village → towns and villages'): /cɕóR + sóN → cɕóR-soN ~ cɕoR-soN/
  - But:
    - kei + tei → keitei (兄+弟→兄弟; 'an elder brother + a younger brother → elder and younger brothers → brothers'): /kéi + téi → kei-tei/
    - shutsu + ketsu → shukketsu (出+欠→出欠; 'presence + absence → presence and absence'): /ɕɯ̥tsɯ́ + kétsɯ → ɕɯ̥Q-ketsɯ/
    - shō + hai → shōhai (勝+敗→勝敗; 'a win + a loss → wins and losses'): /ɕóR + hái → ɕoR-hai/

Dvandvas of western loanwords behave like modifier–head compounds:

- purasu + mainasu → purasu-mainasu (プラス+マイナス→プラスマイナス; 'plus + minus → plus-minus'): /pɯ́ɾasɯ ~ pɯɾasɯ + mainasɯ → pɯɾasɯ-máinasɯ/
- gō + sutoppu → gō-sutoppu (ゴー+ストップ→ゴーストップ; 'go + stop → go and stop → a stoplight'): /ɡóR + sɯ̥tóQpɯ → ɡoR-sɯ̥tóQpɯ/

==== Triple or longer dvandvas ====
Triple or longer dvandvas, especially quinquemoraic or longer ones, tend to be follow the antepenultimate rule:

- inoshikachō (猪鹿蝶; /ino-ɕi̥ká-cɕoR/ 'boar-deer-butterfly'), etc.
- johakyū (序破急; /ʑo-há-kjɯR/ 'introduction-development-conclusion'), setsugetsuka → setsugekka (雪月花; /setsɯ-ɡétsɯ̥-ka → setsɯ-ɡéQ-ka 'snow, the moon and flowers → the scenes of the four seasons'), etc.
- shichōson (市町村; /ɕi̥-cɕóR-soN/ 'cities, towns and villages → Japan's municipalities'), etc.
- (to)dōfuken ((都)道府県; /(to-)doR-ɸɯ̥́-keN → (to-)doR-ɸɯ̥-kéN/ '(to,) dō, fu and ken → (Tokyo,) Hokkaido, Kyoto and Osaka, and other prefectures → Japan's prefectures'), etc.

Some quadrimoraic or shorter dvandvas are unaccented: teniha (弖爾波; /te-ni-ha/ 'te, ni and wa → Japanese particles'), tenioha (弖爾乎波; /te-ni-o-ha/ 'te, ni, o and wa → Japanese particles'), kosoado (こそあど; /ko-so-a-do/ 'ko, so, a and do → Japanese demonstratives and indefinites'), do re mi (ドレミ; /do ɾe mi/), etc.

Some dvandvas are non-compoundified or determined by the first component:

- tsuki + yuki + hana → tsuki yuki hana (月+雪+花→月雪花; 'the moon + snow + a flower → the moon, snow and flowers → the scenes of the four seasons'): /tsɯ̥kí + jɯkí + haná → tsɯ̥kí jɯki̥ hana ~ tsɯ̥kí | jɯkí | haná/
- inu + saru + kiji → Inu Saru Kiji (犬+猿+雉→犬猿雉; 'a dog + a monkey + a green pheasant → Dog, Monkey and Pheasant'): /inɯ́ + sáɾɯ + kiʑi → inɯ́ saɾɯ kiʑi/
- Wa + Kan + Yō → Wa Kan Yō (和+漢+洋→和漢洋; 'Japanese + Chinese + Western → Japanese, Chinese and Western'): /wá + káN + jóR → wa-káN-joR ~ wá kaN joR/

=== Recent loanwords ===
Most recent loanwords (外来語, gairaigo) conform to the antepenultimate rule, and if they are trimoraic or shorter, they tend to be initial-accented:

- gasu (ガス; /gásɯ/; 'gas'), kari (カリ; /káɾi/; 'potash'), gamu (ガム; /ɡámɯ/; 'gum'), pai (パイ; /pái/; 'pi(e)'), kamera (カメラ; /kámeɾa/; 'a camera'), karuto (カルト; /káɾɯto/; 'a cult'), kurasu (クラス; /kɯ́ɾasɯ/; 'class'), kēki (ケーキ; /kéRki/; 'cake'), batā (バター; /bátaR/; 'cake'), merī (メリー; /méɾiR/; 'merry'), etc.
- pike (ピケ; /pí̥ke → pi̥ké/ 'a picket'), supai (スパイ; /sɯ̥́pai → sɯ̥pái/ 'a spy'), etc.
- orību (オリーブ; /oɾíRbɯ/; 'olive'), natoriumu → natoryūmu (ナトリウム・ナトリューム; /natoɾíɯmɯ → natoɾjɯ́Rmɯ/; 'sodium'), orenji (オレンジ; /oɾéNʑi/; 'orange'), sukāto (スカート; /sɯ̥káRto/; 'a skirt'), torippu (トリップ; /toɾíQpɯ/; 'a trip'), raketto (ラケット; /ɾakéQto/; 'a racket'), asufaruto (アスファルト; /asɯɸáɾɯto/; 'asphalt'), sutoraiki (ストライキ; /sɯ̥toɾáiki/; 'a labor strike'), sutoraiku (ストライク; /sɯ̥toɾáikɯ/; 'a baseball strike'), chokorēto (チョコレート; /cɕokoɾéRto/; 'chocolate'), arufabetto (アルファベット; /aɾɯɸabéQto/; 'an alphabet'), Airurando (アイルランド; /aiɾɯɾáNdo/; 'Ireland'), daiyamondo (ダイヤモンド; /daijamóNdo/; 'diamond'), Orinpikku (オリンピック; /oɾiNpí̥Qkɯ/; 'the Olympics'), etc.
- kurowassan (クロワッサン; /kɯɾowáQsaN/; 'a croissant'), konpasu (コンパス; /kóNpasɯ/; 'a compass'), enjin (エンジン; /éNʑiN/; 'an engine'), ōdio (オーディオ; /óRdio/; 'audio'), kappuru (カップル; /káQpɯɾɯ/; 'couple'), saidā (サイダー; /sáidaR/; 'lemon/lime-flavored soft drink'), sutōrī (ストーリー; /sɯ̥tóRɾiR/; 'a story'), suponsā (スポンサー; /sɯ̥póNsaR/; 'a sponsor'), doressā (ドレッサー; /doɾéQsaR/; 'a dresser'), purinsesu (プリンセス; /pɯɾíNsesɯ/; 'a princess'), buroirā (ブロイラー; /bɯɾóiɾaR/; 'a broiler'), imitēshon (イミテーション; /imitéRɕoN/; 'imitation'), arubaitā (アルバイター; /aɾɯbáitaR/; 'a part-timer'), etc.
- man-tsū-man (マンツーマン; /maN-tsɯ́R-maN/ 'man-to-man'), a ra karuto (アラカルト; /a ɾa káɾɯto/ 'à la carte'), pureta-porute (プレタポルテ; /pɯɾeta-póɾɯte/ 'prêt-à-porter'), etc.

Some words retain their accent locations in English, especially if they are tri- or quadrimoraic, and/or end in /R/ or /N/, and/or have been freshly borrowed. These words reflect the awareness of English accent among Japanese speakers, but it is not known why only some words but not others behave this way. In some cases where there are more than one acceptable pattern, the one based on the antepenultimate rule tends to be more common among older speakers, while the one based on the original English accent more common among younger speakers.

- Japan /dʒəˈpan/ → Japan (ジャパン) /ʑapáN/
- machine /məˈʃɪjn/ → mashin (マシン) /maɕíN/
- onion /ˈɐnɪjən/ → onion (オニオン) /ónioN/
- champion /ˈtʃampɪjən/ → chanpion (チャンピオン) /cɕáNpioN/
- accordion /əˈkoːdɪjən/ → akōdion (アコーディオン) /akóRdioN ~ akoRdíoN/
- production /pɹəˈdɐkʃən/ → purodakushon (プロダクション) /pɯɾodákɯ̥ɕoN ~ pɯɾodakɯ̥ɕoN/
- fry /fɹɑj/ / fly /flɑj/ → furai (フライ) /ɸɯɾái/
- poster /ˈpəwstə/ → posutā (ポスター) /pósɯ̥taR/
- helicopter /ˈhɛlɪkɔptə ~ ˌhɛlɪˈkɔptə/ → herikoputā (ヘリコプター) /heɾikópɯ̥taR/
- instructor /ɪnˈstrɐktə/ → insutorakutā (インストラクター) /iNsɯ̥toɾákɯ̥taR/
- ski /skɪj/ → sukī (スキー) /sɯ̥kíR/
- free /fɹɪj/ → furī (フリー) /ɸɯɾíR/
- calorie /ˈkaləɹɪj/ → karorī (カロリー) /káɾoɾiR/
- comedy /ˈkɔmədɪj/ → komedī (コメディー) /kómediR/
- symphony /ˈsɪmfənɪj/ → shinfonī (シンフォニー) /ɕíNɸoniR/
- majority /məˈdʒɔɹətɪj/ → majoritī (マジョリティー) /maʑóɾitiR/
- vitality /vɑjˈtalətɪj/ → baitaritī (バイタリティー) /baitáɾitiR/
- technology /tɛkˈnɔlədʒɪj/ → tekunorojī (テクノロジー) /tekɯnóɾoʑiR/
- taboo /təˈbʉw/ → tabū (タブー) /tabɯ́R/
- blue /blʉw/ → burū (ブルー) /bɯɾɯ́R/
- review /ɹɪˈvjʉw/ → rebyū (レビュー) /ɾebjɯ́R/
- interview /ˈɪntəvjʉw/ → intabyū (インタビュー) /íNtabjɯR ~ iNtábjɯR/
- grey /ɡɹɛj/ → gurē (グレー) /ɡɯɾéR/
- challenge /ˈtʃalɪndʒ/ → charenji (チャレンジ) /cɕaɾéNʑi ~ cɕáɾeNʑi/
- message /ˈmɛsɪdʒ/ → messēji (メッセージ) /méQseRʑi/
- Cambridge /ˈkɛjmbɹɪdʒ/ → Kenburijji (ケンブリッジ) /kéNbɯɾiQʑi/
- garlic /ˈɡɑːlɪk/ → gārikku (ガーリック) /ɡáRɾiQkɯ/
- living /ˈlɪvɪŋ/ → ribingu (リビング) /ɾíbiNɡɯ/
- cycling /ˈsɑjklɪŋ/ → saikuringu (サイクリング) /sáikɯɾiNɡɯ/
- stocking /ˈstɔkɪŋ/ → sutokkingu (ストッキング) /sɯ̥tóQkiNɡɯ/
- dressing /ˈdɹɛsɪŋ/ → doresshingu (ドレッシング) /doɾéQɕiNɡɯ/
- pickles /ˈpɪkəlz/ → pikurusu (ピクルス) /pí̥kɯɾɯsɯ/
- business /ˈbɪznɪs/ → bijinesu (ビジネス) /bíʑinesɯ/
- guidance /ˈɡɑjdəns/ → gaidansu (ガイダンス) /ɡáidaNsɯ/
- licence /ˈlɑjsəns/ → raisensu (ライセンス) /ɾáiseNsɯ/
- cocktail /ˈkɔktɛjl/ → kakuteru (カクテル) /kákɯ̥teɾɯ/
- capsule /ˈkapsjʉwl/ → kapuseru (カプセル) /kápɯ̥seɾɯ/
- terminal /ˈtəːmɪnəl/ → tāminaru (ターミナル) /táRminaɾɯ/
- tropical /ˈtɹɔpɪkəl/ → toropikaru (トロピカル) /toɾópi̥kaɾɯ/
- text /ˈtɛkst/ → tekisuto (テキスト) /tékisɯ̥to ~ tekísɯ̥to/
- unit /ˈjʉwnɪt/ → junitto (ユニット) /jɯ́niQto ~ jɯníQto/
- accent /ˈaksənt/ → akusento (アクセント) /ákɯ̥seNto/
- present /ˈprɛzənt/ → purezento (プレゼント) /pɯɾézeNto/
- project /ˈpɹɔdʒɛkt/ → purojekuto (プロジェクト) /pɯɾóʑekɯ̥to ~ pɯɾoʑékɯ̥to/
- assessment /əˈsɛsmənt/ → asesumento (アセスメント) /asésɯmeNto/
- consultant /kənˈsɐltənt/ → konsarutanto (コンサルタント) /koNsáɾɯtaNto/
- England /ˈɪŋɡlənd/ → Ingurando (イングランド) /íNɡɯɾaNdo/

Some old or high-frequency words, especially quadrimoraic ones, are unaccented. The deaccentuation of high-frequency recent loanwords has been dubbed "specialist accent" (専門家アクセント, senmonka akusento):

- orugan (オルガン; /oɾɯɡaN/; 'an organ'), saboten (サボテン; /saboteN/; 'a cactus'), purachina (プラチナ; /pɯɾacɕina/; 'platinum'), foa gura (フォアグラ; /ɸoa ɡɯɾa/; 'foie gras'), omuretsu (オムレツ; /omɯɾetsɯ/; 'an omelette'), nonburu (ノンブル; /noNbɯɾɯ/; 'pagination'), kiseru (キセル; /ki̥seɾɯ/; 'a smoking pipe'), garasu (ガラス; /ɡaɾasɯ/; 'a glass'), koppu (コップ; /koQpɯ/; 'a cup'), moruhine (モルヒネ; /moɾɯhine/; 'morphine'), arukōru (アルコール; /aɾɯkoRɾɯ/; 'alcohol'), karē (カレー; /kaɾeR/; 'curry'), baketsu (バケツ; /baketsɯ/; 'a bucket'), aian (アイアン; /aiaN/; 'a golf iron'), airon (アイロン; /aiɾoN/; 'a clothes iron'), arubamu (アルバム; /aɾɯbamɯ/; 'an album'), katsuretsu (カツレツ; /katsɯɾetsɯ/; 'a cutlet'), sutajio (スタジオ; /sɯ̥taʑio/; 'a studio'), manikyua (マニキュア; /manikjɯa/; 'manicure'), baiorin (バイオリン; /baioɾiN/; 'a violin'), etc.
- dēta (データ; /déRta ~ deRta/; 'data'), botan (ボタン; /botaN ~ bótaN/; 'a button'), doramu (ドラム; /dóɾamɯ ~ doɾamɯ/; 'a drum'), mēru (メール; /méRɾɯ ~ meRɾɯ/; 'e-mail'), sākuru (サークル; /sáRkɯɾɯ ~ saRkɯɾɯ/; 'a circle'), tōsuto (トースト; /tóRsɯ̥to ~ toRsɯ̥to/; 'toast'), ripōto (リポート; /ɾipóRto ~ ɾipoRto/; 'a report'), manējā (マネージャー; /manéRʑaR ~ maneRʑaR/; 'a manager'), etc.

==== Compounds with recent-loanword heads ====
Recent loanwords generally behave like long heads in modifier–head compounds:

- Originally unaccented heads:
  - mechiru + arukōru → mechiru arukōru (メチル+アルコール→メチルアルコール; 'methyl + alcohol → methyl alcohol'): /mécɕiɾɯ + aɾɯkoRɾɯ → mecɕiɾɯ áɾɯkoRɾɯ/
  - paipu + orugan → paipu organ (パイプ+オルガン→パイプオルガン; 'a pipe + an organ → a pipe organ'): /paipɯ ~ páipɯ + oɾɯɡaN → paipɯ óɾɯɡaN/
  - mēn + tēburu → mēn tēburu (メーン+テーブル→メーンテーブル; 'main + a table → the main table'): /méRN + teRbɯɾɯ → meRN téRbɯɾɯ/
  - denki + airon → denki airon (電気+アイロン→電気アイロン; 'electricity + a clothes iron → an electric iron'): /déNki + aiɾoN → deNki áiɾoN/
  - kita + Amerika → Kitaamerika (北+アメリカ→北アメリカ; 'north + America → North America'): /ki̥ta ~ ki̥tá + ameɾika → ki̥ta-ámeɾika/
  - mado + garasu → madogarasu (窓+ガラス→窓ガラス; 'a window + glass → window glass'): /mádo + ɡaɾasɯ → mado-ɡáɾasɯ/
- Originally initial-accented heads:
  - hotto + kēki → hottokēki (ホット+ケーキ→ホットケーキ; 'hot + cake → hotcake'): /hóQto + kéRki → hoQto kéRki/
  - taimu + suitchi → taimu suitchi (タイム+スイッチ→タイムスイッチ; 'time + a switch → a time switch'): /táimɯ + sɯ́iQcɕi ~ sɯíQcɕi → taimɯ sɯ́iQcɕi ~ taimɯ sɯíQcɕi/
  - basu + tāminaru → basu tāminaru (バス+ターミナル→バスターミナル; 'a bus + a terminal → a bus terminal'): /básɯ + táRminaɾɯ → basɯ̥ táRminaɾɯ/
  - Nihon + terebi → Nihon Terebi (日本+テレビ→日本テレビ; 'Japan + TV → Nippon TV'): /nihóN + téɾebi → nihoN téɾebi/
  - bōen + renzu → bōen renzu (望遠+レンズ→望遠レンズ; 'viewing far + a lens → a telephoto lens'): /boReN + ɾéNzɯ → boReN ɾéNzɯ/
  - tōnan + Ajia → Tōnan Ajia (東南+アジア→東南アジア; 'southeast + Asia → Southeast Asia'): /toRnaN + áʑia → toRnaN áʑia/
  - kita + Arupusu → Kitaarupusu (北+アルプス→北アルプス; 'north + the Alps → the Northern Alps'): /ki̥ta ~ ki̥tá + áɾɯpɯ̥sɯ → ki̥ta-áɾɯpɯ̥sɯ/
  - tansan + gasu → tansan gasu (炭酸+ガス→炭酸ガス; 'carbonic acid + gas → carbonic gas'): /taNsaN + ɡásɯ → taNsaN ɡásɯ/
  - seisan + kari → seisan kari (青酸+カリ→青酸カリ; 'prussic acid + potash → potassium cyanide'): /seisaN + káɾi → seisaN káɾi/
  - nishi + Doitsu → Nishidoitsu (西+ドイツ→西ドイツ; 'west + Germany → West Germany'): /niɕi + dóitsɯ → niɕi-dóitsɯ/
  - denshi + renji → denshi renji (電子+レンジ→電子レンジ; 'an electron + a kitchen range → a microwave oven'): /déNɕi + ɾéNʑi → deNɕi ɾéNʑi/
- Originally medial-accented heads:
  - nama + kurīmu → namakurīmu (生+クリーム→生クリーム; 'fresh + cream → fresh cream'): /náma + kɯɾíRmɯ → nama-kɯɾíRmɯ/
  - aisu + kurīmu → aisu kurīmu (アイス+クリーム→アイスクリーム; 'ice + cream → ice cream'): /áisɯ + kɯɾíRmɯ → aisɯ̥ kɯɾíRmɯ/
  - hangā + sutoraiki → hangā sutoraiki (ハンガー+ストライキ→ハンガーストライキ; 'hunger + a labor strike → a hunger strike'): /háNɡaR + sɯ̥toɾáiki → haNɡaR sɯ̥toɾáiki/

Bimoraic heads with a special final mora may behave like preaccenting short heads instead:

- doraibu + in → doraibuin (ドライブ+イン→ドライブイン; 'a drive + in → a drive-in'): /doɾáibɯ + íN → doɾaibɯ́-iN ~ doɾaibɯ-íN/
- sandoitchi + man → sandoitchiman (サンドイッチ+マン→サンドイッチマン; 'a sandwich + a man → a sandwichman'): /saNdoíQcɕi + máN → saNdoiQcɕí-maN ~ saNdoíQcɕi-maN/
- sērusu + man → sērusuman (セールス+マン→セールスマン; 'sales + a man → a salesman'): /séRɾɯsɯ + máN → seRɾɯsɯ́-maN/
- hōmu + ran → hōmuran (ホーム+ラン→ホームラン; 'home + a run → a homerun'): /hóRmɯ + ɾáN → hoRmɯ́-ɾaN/
- patorōru + kā → patorōrukā → patokā (パトロール+カー→パトロールカー→パトカー; 'patrol + a car → a patrol car'): /patoɾóRɾɯ + káR → patoɾoRɾɯ́-kaR ~ patoɾoRɾɯ-káR → pató-kaR ~ pato-káR/
- hābu + tī → hābutī (ハーブ+ティー→ハーブティー; 'herb + tea → herb tea'): /háRbɯ + tíR → haRbɯ-tíR ~ haRbɯ́-tiR/
- remon + tī → remontī (レモン+ティー→レモンティー; 'lemon + tea → lemon tea'): /ɾémoN ~ ɾemoN + tíR → ɾemóN-tiR ~ ɾemoN-tíR/

Old or high-frequency borrowings may be unaccented:

- kurīmu + pan → kurīmupan (クリーム+パン→クリームパン; 'cream + bread → a cream bun'): /kɯɾíRmɯ + páN → kɯɾiRmɯ́-paN ~ kɯɾiRmɯ-paN/
- furai + pan → furaipan (フライ+パン→フライパン; 'fry + a pan → a frypan'): /ɸɯɾai ~ ɸɯɾá + páN → ɸɯɾai-paN/
- raito + ban → raitoban (ライト+バン→ライトバン; 'light + a van → a compact van'): /ɾáito + báN → ɾaito-baN/
- bōru + pen → bōrupen (ボール+ペン→ボールペン; 'a ball + a pen → a ballpoint pen'): /boRɾɯ + péN → boRɾɯ-peN/

Quadrimoraic or shorter compounds with non-loanword modifiers may be unaccented:

- toshi + gasu → toshigasu (都市+ガス→都市ガス; 'a city + gas → city gas'): /tóɕi + ɡásɯ → toɕi ɡasɯ ~ toɕi-ɡásɯ/
- To + basu → Tobasu (都+バス→都バス; 'Tokyo + a bus → a Tokyo-run bus'): /tó + básɯ → to-basɯ/
- wa + gomu → wagomu (輪+ゴム→輪ゴム; 'a hoop + rubber → an elastic band'): /wá + ɡómɯ → wa-ɡomɯ/
- kashi + pan → kashipan (菓子+パン→菓子パン; 'candy + bread → a sweet bun'): /káɕi + páN → kaɕi̥-paN/
- mushi + pin → mushipin (虫+ピン→虫ピン; 'an insect + a pin → an insect pin'): /mɯɕi + píN → mɯɕi̥-piN/
- fude + pen → fudepen (筆+ペン→筆ペン; 'a brush + a pen → a brush pen'): /ɸɯde + péN → ɸɯde-peN/

Some compounds retain the original the original English accent, especially by those familiar with English, or if the compound is quadrimoraic or shorter:

- necktie /ˈnɛktɑj/ → nekutai (ネクタイ) /nékɯ̥-tai/
- one-man /ˈwɐnman/ → wanman (ワンマン) /wáN-maN/
- pen pal /ˈpɛn pal/ → penparu (ペンパル) /péN-paɾɯ/
- guardsman /ˈɡɑːdzmən/ → gādoman (ガードマン) /ɡáRdo-maN/
- salesman /ˈsɛjlzmən/ → sērusuman (セールスマン) /seRɾɯsɯ́-maN ~ séRɾɯsɯ-maN/
- hitchhike /ˈhɪtʃhɑjk/ → hitchihaiku (ヒッチハイク) /hi̥Qcɕi-háikɯ ~ hí̥Qcɕi-haikɯ/
- earring /ˈɪːɹɪŋ/ → iyaringu (イヤリング) /íja-ɾiNɡɯ/

Initialisms may be:

- Unaccented:
  - SF /ˌɛsˈɛf/ → /esɯ-eɸɯ/
  - LL /ˌɛlˈɛl/ → /eɾɯ-eɾɯ/
- Penultimate-accented if the last mora is lengthening or offglide, which happens to be the same location for the primary accent in English:
  - OB /ˌəwˈbɪj/ → /oR-bíR/
  - CD /ˌsɪjˈdɪj/ → /ɕiR-díR/
  - cc /ˌsɪjˈsɪj/ → /ɕiR-ɕíR/
  - PTA /ˌpɪjtɪjˈɛj/ → /piR-tiR-éR/
  - YMCA /ˌwɑjɛmsɪjˈɛj/ → /wai-emɯ-ɕiR-éR/
  - GI /ˌdʒɪjˈɑj/ → /ʑiR-ái/
- Also: ppm /ˌpɪjpɪjˈɛm/ → /piR-piR-émɯ/

=== Noun + particle ===
Particles following nouns can be classified into the following groups (asterisked particles belong to more than one group):

- Special: no / n
- Recessive and preaccenting (RecPre): shika*
- Recessive and unaccented (Rec0): ka, ga, sa, de, to / to shite / tte, ni, wa (は), e, mo, ya, yo, o, kara, kiri, shika*, dake*, hodo
- Recessive and final-accented (Rec−1): ne, ka na (doubt) / ka ne, yue*
- Recessive and initial-accented (Rec+1): ka i / ka na (exclamation) / ka mo, koso, sae, shika*, shimo, sura, da to / da no / da tte, de wa (では) / de mo, to ka / to te / to wa (とは) / to mo, nado / na no de / na no ni / na n ka / na n te, nara(ba), nari, ni wa (には) / ni mo, nē, nomi, e wa (へは) / e mo, made, yara, yue*, yori / yori ka / yori mo, kashira, kurai* / gurai*, dokoro*, bakari*
- Dominant and initial-accented (Dom+1): gatera, kurai* / gurai*, dokoro*, bakari*
- Dominant and deaccenting (DomDe): dake*

Noun type			Special	RecPre	Rec0	Rec−1	Rec+1	Dom+1	DomDe
Unaccented	ki (気; 'spirits')	/ki/	/ki no/	/kí ɕi̥ka/	/ki ɕi̥ka/ /ki dake/	/ki̥ ka ná/	/ki ɕí̥ka/ /ki ɡɯ́ɾai/ /ki̥ ká na/	/ki ɡɯ́ɾai/	/ki dake/
Unaccented	hashi (端; 'an edge')	/haɕi/	/haɕi no/	/haɕí ɕi̥ka/	/haɕi ɕi̥ka/ /haɕi dake/	/haɕi̥ ka ná/	/haɕi ɕí̥ka/ /haɕi ɡɯ́ɾai/ /haɕi̥ ká na/	/haɕi ɡɯ́ɾai/	/haɕi dake/
Unaccented	sakura (桜; 'a cherry blossom')	/sakɯɾa/	/sakɯɾa no/	/sakɯɾá ɕi̥ka/	/sakɯɾa ɕi̥ka/ /sakɯɾa dake/	/sakɯɾa ka ná/	/sakɯɾa ɕí̥ka/ /sakɯɾa ɡɯ́ɾai/ /sakɯɾa ká na/	/sakɯɾa ɡɯ́ɾai/	/sakɯɾa dake/
Final-accented	hashi (橋; 'a bridge')	/haɕí/	/haɕi no/	/haɕí ɕi̥ka/	/haɕí ɕi̥ka/ /haɕí dake/	/haɕí̥ ka na/	/haɕí ɕi̥ka/ /haɕí ɡɯɾai/ /haɕí̥ ka na/	/haɕi ɡɯ́ɾai/	/haɕi dake/
Final-accented	yasumi (休み; 'rest')	/jasɯmí/	/jasɯmi no/	/jasɯmí ɕi̥ka/	/jasɯmí ɕi̥ka/ /jasɯmí dake/	/jasɯmí ka na/	/jasɯmí ɕi̥ka/ /jasɯmí ɡɯɾai/ /jasɯmí ka na/	/jasɯmi ɡɯ́ɾai/	/jasɯmi dake/
Medially penultimate-accented with a special final mora	kinō (昨日; 'yesterday')	/kinóR/	/kinoR no/	/kinóR ɕi̥ka/	/kinóR ɕi̥ka/ /kinóR dake/	/kinóR ka na/	/kinóR ɕi̥ka ~ kinóR | ɕí̥ka/ /kinóR ɡɯɾai ~ kinóR | ɡɯ́ɾai/ /kinóR ka na ~ kinóR | ká na/	/kinoR ɡɯ́ɾai/	/kinoR dake/
Medially penultimate-accented with a special final mora	Nihon (日本; 'Japan')	/nihóN/	/nihoN no ~ nihóN no/	/nihóN ɕi̥ka/	/nihóN ɕi̥ka/ /nihóN dake/	/nihóN ka na/	/nihóN ɕi̥ka ~ nihóN | ɕí̥ka/ /nihóN ɡɯɾai ~ nihóN | ɡɯ́ɾai/ /nihóN ka na ~ nihóN | ká na/	/nihoN ɡɯ́ɾai/	/nihoN dake/
Medially penultimate-accented with a special final mora	ototoi (一昨日; 'the day before yesterday')	/ototói/	/ototoi no ~ ototói no/	/ototói ɕi̥ka/	/ototói ɕi̥ka/ /ototói dake/	/ototói ka na/	/ototói ɕi̥ka ~ ototói | ɕí̥ka/ /ototói ɡɯɾai ~ ototói | ɡɯ́ɾai/ /ototói ka na ~ ototói | ká na/	/ototoi ɡɯ́ɾai/	/ototoi dake/
Medial-accented	okashi (お菓子; 'a sweet')	/okáɕi/	/okáɕi no/	/okáɕi ɕi̥ka/	/okáɕi ɕi̥ka/ /okáɕi dake/	/okáɕi̥ ka na/	/okáɕi ɕi̥ka ~ okáɕi | ɕí̥ka/ /okáɕi ɡɯɾai ~ okáɕi | ɡɯ́ɾai/ /okáɕi̥ ka na ~ okáɕi̥ | ká na/	/okaɕi ɡɯ́ɾai/	/okaɕi dake/
Medial-accented	nomimono (飲み物; 'a drink')	/nomímono/	/nomímono no/	/nomímono ɕi̥ka/	/nomímono ɕi̥ka/ /nomímono dake/	/nomímono ka na/	/nomímono ɕi̥ka ~ nomímono | ɕí̥ka/ /nomímono ɡɯɾai ~ nomímono | ɡɯ́ɾai/ /nomímono ka na ~ nomímono | ká na/	/nomimono ɡɯ́ɾai/	/nomimono dake/
Medial-accented	mizuumi (湖; 'a lake')	/mizɯɯ́mi/	/mizɯɯ́mi no/	/mizɯɯ́mi ɕi̥ka/	/mizɯɯ́mi ɕi̥ka/ /mizɯɯ́mi dake/	/mizɯɯ́mi ka na/	/mizɯɯ́mi ɕi̥ka ~ mizɯɯ́mi | ɕí̥ka/ /mizɯɯ́mi ɡɯɾai ~ mizɯɯ́mi | ɡɯ́ɾai/ /mizɯɯ́mi ka na ~ mizɯɯ́mi | ká na/	/mizɯɯmi ɡɯ́ɾai/	/mizɯɯmi dake/
Initial-accented	ki (木; 'a tree')	/kí/	/kí no/	/kí ɕi̥ka/	/kí ɕi̥ka/ /kí dake/	/kí̥ ka na/	/kí ɕi̥ka/ /kí ɡɯɾai/ /kí̥ ka na/	/ki ɡɯ́ɾai/	/ki dake/
Initial-accented	hashi (箸; 'a chopstick')	/háɕi/	/háɕi no/	/háɕi ɕi̥ka/	/háɕi ɕi̥ka/ /háɕi dake/	/háɕi̥ ka na/	/háɕi ɕi̥ka ~ háɕi | ɕí̥ka/ /háɕi ɡɯɾai ~ háɕi | ɡɯ́ɾai/ /háɕi̥ ka na ~ háɕi̥ | ká na/	/haɕi ɡɯ́ɾai/	/haɕi dake/
Initial-accented	midori (緑; 'green')	/mídoɾi/	/mídoɾi no/	/mídoɾi ɕi̥ka/	/mídoɾi ɕi̥ka/ /mídoɾi dake/	/mídoɾi ka na/	/mídoɾi ɕi̥ka ~ mídoɾi | ɕí̥ka/ /mídoɾi ɡɯɾai ~ mídoɾi | ɡɯ́ɾai/ /mídoɾi ka na ~ mídoɾi | ká na/	/midoɾi ɡɯ́ɾai/	/midoɾi dake/

==== No ====
As shown above, the particle no, as well as its reduced variant n, can deaccent many final-accented nouns, as well as some medially penultimate-accented nouns whose last mora is special. It is not conclusive how many medially penultimate-accented nouns no can deaccent, although it has been suggested that deaccentable nouns are not as common as undeaccentable ones.

The following list includes sample nouns that do not get deaccented:

- Nouns that express numerical quantity or order:
  - tsugi no hito (次の人; /tsɯɡí no hi̥to/ 'the next person'), hyaku no hito (百の人; /hjakɯ́ no hi̥to/ 'the hundred people'), futatsu no kodomo (二つの子供; /ɸɯ̥tatsɯ́ no kodomo/ 'a two-year-old'), nido no tsutome (二度の勤め; /nidó no tsɯ̥tome/ 'working at the same place after quitting', lit. 'second-time work'), ichinichi no shigoto (一日の仕事; /icɕinicɕí no ɕiɡoto/ 'a one-day job'), etc.
  - gonin no ko (五人の子; /ɡoníN no ko/ 'the five children'), hyakuman no mikata (百万の味方; /hjakɯmáN no mikata/ 'invincibility', lit. 'the million allies'), takusan no hana (沢山の花; /takɯ̥sáN no hana/ 'a profusion of flowers'), ōzei no hito (大勢の人; /oRzéi no hi̥to/ 'a flock of people'), etc.
- Province names: Tosa no kuni (土佐国; /tosá no kɯni/ 'Tosa Province'), Mino no kuni (美濃国; /minó no kɯni/ 'Mino Province'), Sagami no kuni (相模国; /saɡamí no kɯni/ 'Sagami Province'), Shinano no kuni (信濃国; /ɕinanó no kɯni/ 'Shinano Province'), Mikawa no kuni (三河国; /mikawá no kɯni/ 'Mikawa Province'), etc.
- Art names: Enchō no hanashi (円朝の噺; /eNcɕóR no hanaɕi/ 'Enchō's story'), Baikō no gei (梅幸の芸; /baikóR no | ɡéi/ 'Baikō's craft'), etc.
- Nouns that become final-accented due to rightward shifts away from devoiced vowels:
  - kiki no toki (危機の時; /ki̥kí no toki/ 'an opportune time'), shiki no uta (四季の歌; /ɕi̥kí no ɯta/ 'a song of four seasons'), Chichi no Hi (父の日; /cɕí̥cɕi no hi → cɕi̥cɕí no hi/ 'Father's Day'), hisho no shigoto (秘書の仕事; /hi̥ɕó no ɕiɡoto/ 'secretarial work'), fuki no kyaku (不帰の客; /ɸɯ̥kí no kjakɯ/ 'a dead person', lit. 'an unreturning guest'), etc.
  - kisha no naka (汽車の中; /ki̥ɕá no naka ~ ki̥ɕa no náka/ 'on the train'), chichi no heya (父の部屋; /cɕi̥cɕí no heja ~ cɕi̥cɕi no hejá/ 'one's father's room'), etc.
- Exceptions of medially penultimate-accented nouns with a special final mora:
  - /N/: ehon no sashie (絵本の挿絵; /ehóN no saɕie/ 'a picture-book illustration'), Japan no gogen (ジャパンの語源; /ʑapáN no ɡoɡeN/ 'the etymology of Japan'), wantan no kawa (ワンタンの皮; /waNtáN no kawa/ 'a wonton wrapper'), mashin no teishi (マシンの停止; /maɕíN no teiɕi/ 'the shutdown of a machine'), etc.
    - Nouns that become medially penultimate-accented due to rightward shifts away from devoiced vowels: shikin no fusoku (資金の不足; /ɕi̥kíN no ɸɯ̥sokɯ/ 'lack of funding'), shiken no hi (試験の日; /ɕi̥kéN no hi/ 'an exam day'), fukin no jūmin (付近の住民; /ɸɯ̥kíN no ʑɯRmiN/ 'local residents'), etc.
  - /R/: kōjō no haisui (工場の排水; /koRʑóR no haisɯi/ 'factory effluent'), hyōjō no kaizen (表情の改善; /hjoRʑóR no kaizen/ 'improvement in facial expressions'), kōhī no aji (コーヒーの味; /koRhíR no aʑi/ 'coffee taste'), burū no fuku (ブルーの服; /bɯɾɯ́R no ɸɯ̥kɯ/ 'blue clothes'), etc.
  - /i/: negai no koto (願いの事; /neɡái no koto ~ neɡai no kotó/ 'one's desire'), nioi no nai (匂いの無い; /niói no | nái ~ nioi no nái/ 'that is free of odor'), etc.
  - /ei → eR/: sensei no kōgi (先生の講義; /seNséi no koRɡi → seNséR no koRɡi/ 'a teacher's lecture'), etc.
- Other exceptions: yoso no kuni (余所の国; /josó no kɯni/ 'a foreign country'), heta no yokozuki (下手の横好き; /hetá no jokozɯki/ 'an unskilled person'), etc.

In order for deaccentuation to be realized, the noun phrase before no must be in the same minor phrase as the noun phrase after it. If there is a break between the noun phrases, deaccentuation is blocked:

- yama no ue ni wa ie ga atta (山の上には家があった; 'on the mountain, there was a house'): /jama no ɯé ni wa | ié ɡa aQta ~ jamá no | ɯe ní wa | ié ɡa aQta/
- otona no tame no piano kyōshitsu (大人の為のピアノ教室; 'a piano course for adults'): /otona no tame no piano kjóRɕi̥tsɯ ~ otona no tamé no | piano kjóRɕi̥tsɯ/

If there is no noun phrase after no as a result of ellipsis, deaccentuation does not obtain:

- kore wa inu no kubiwa darō (これは犬の首輪だろう; 'this must be the dog's collar'): /koɾe wa inɯ no kɯbiwa daɾóR/

→ kore wa inu no darō (これは犬のだろう; 'this must be the dog's'): /koɾe wa inɯ́ no daɾoR/

- uma no wara wa kore desu (馬の藁はこれです; 'the horse's straw is this'): /uma no wáɾa wa koɾe desɯ/

→ uma no wa kore desu (馬のはこれです; 'the horse's is this'): /umá no wa koɾe desɯ/

But the elliptical phrase can still be deaccented before the particle ne ('right?'):

- uma ne (馬ね; 'it’s a horse, isn’t it?'): /ɯmá ne/
- uma no ne (馬のね; 'it’s a horse’s, isn’t it?'): /ɯma no ne/
- Nihon ne (日本ね; 'it’s Japan, isn’t it?'): /nihóN ne/
- Nihon no ne (日本のね; 'it’s Japan’s, isn’t it?'): /nihoN no ne/

Deaccentuation is also blocked by an attributive expression that directly modifies the final-accented noun. If the noun belongs to a larger phrase, however, deaccentuation applies as normal:

- kono {uma no iro} (この{馬の色}; 'this {horsey color}'): /kono {ɯma no iɾó}/
- {kono uma} no iro ({この馬}の色; '{this horse}'s color'): /{kono ɯmá} no iɾo/
- {ane no uma} no kubiwa ({姉の馬}の首輪; '{one's elder sister's horse}'s collar'): /{ane no ɯmá} no kɯbiwa/
- {akai uma} no kubiwa ({赤い馬}の首輪; '{the red horse}'s collar'): /{akai ɯmá} no kɯbiwa/
- {nete iru uma} no kubiwa ({寝ている馬}の首輪; '{the sleeping horse}'s collar'): /{nete iɾɯ ɯmá} no kɯbiwa/
- {aru uma} no kubiwa ({ある馬}の首輪; '{some horse}'s collar'): /{áɾɯ | ɯmá} no kɯbiwa/

Here is a non-exhaustive list of irregularly accented idiomatic and collocational compounds with no, with:

- No expected deaccentuation of the pre-no noun:
  - hare + basho → hare no basho (晴れ+の+場所→晴れの場所; 'clear weather + a place → a public place'): /haɾé + baɕo → haɾé no baɕo/
  - mina + mono → mina no mono (皆+者→皆の者; 'everyone + a person → you lot'): /miná + monó → miná no mono/
  - mina + shū → mina no shū (皆+衆→皆の衆; 'everyone + people → all of you'): /miná + ɕɯ́R → miná no ɕɯR/
  - otoko + ko → otoko no ko (男+子→男の子; 'a male person + a child → a boy'): /otokó + ko → otokó no ko/
  - onna + ko → onna no ko (女+子→女の子; 'a female person + a child → a girl'): /oNná + ko → oNná no ko/
- Unexpected deaccentuation of the pre-no noun:
  - ni + tsugi → ni no tsugi (二+次→二の次; 'second + next → secondary in priority'): /ní + tsɯɡí → ni no tsɯɡí/
  - hi + yōjin → hi no yōjin (火+用心→火の用心; 'a fire + precautions → precautions against fire'): /hí + jóRʑiN → hi no jóRʑiN/
  - me + kataki → me no kataki (目+敵→目の敵; 'an eye + a foe → someone detestable to see'): /mé + katakí → me no katakí/
  - aka + gohan → aka no gohan (赤+御飯→赤の御飯; 'red + cooked rice → red-colored rice'): /áka + ɡóhaN → aka no ɡóhaN/
  - aka + manma → aka no manma (赤+飯→赤の飯; 'red + cooked rice → red-colored rice'): /áka + máNma → aka no máNma/
  - ita + ma → ita no ma (板+間→板の間; 'a plank + a room → a wooden-floored room'): /íta + ma → ita no ma/
  - dō + ma → dō no ma (胴+間→胴の間; 'a torso + room → a Japanese boat's hull'): /dóR + ma → doR no ma/
  - naka + ma → naka no ma (中+間→中の間; 'the middle + a room → the room in the middle of the house'): /náka + ma → naka no ma/
  - ima + uchi → ima no uchi (今+内→今の内; 'now + the inside → right now'): /íma + ɯcɕi → ima no ɯcɕi/
  - ima + tokoro → ima no tokoro (今+所→今の所; 'no + a place → this stage'): /íma + tokoɾo → ima no tokoɾo/
  - kokō + shin → kokō no shin (股肱+臣→股肱の臣; 'the thighs and brachii + a vassal → a trusted vassal'): /kókoR + ɕíN → kokoR no ɕíN/
  - sanshu + jingi → Sanshu no Jingi (三種+神器→三種の神器; 'three types + a divine instrument → the Three Sacred Treasures'): /sáNɕɯ + ʑíNɡi → saNɕɯ no ʑíNɡi/
  - makura + sōshi → Makura no Sōshi (枕+草子→枕草子; 'a pillow + a book → the The Pillow Book'): /mákɯɾa + sóRɕi ~ soRɕi → makɯɾa no sóRɕi ~ mákɯɾa no soRɕi/
- Unexpected accent patterns for the whole compounds:
  - U + toshi → U no toshi (卯+年→卯の年; 'the Hare + a year → the Year of the Hare'): /ɯ ~ ɯ́ + toɕí → ɯ nó toɕi/
  - cha + yu → cha no yu (茶+湯→茶の湯; 'tea + hot water → Japanese tea ceremony'): /cɕa + jɯ́ → cɕa no jɯ/
  - hi + moto → Hi no Moto (日+本→日の本; 'the sun + a base → Japan'): /hi + motó ~ moto ~ móto → hi no moto ~ hi nó moto/
  - hi + moto → hi no moto (火+元→火の元; 'a fire + an origin → a possible cause of fire'): /hí + motó ~ moto ~ móto → hi nó moto/
  - mi + take → mi no take (身+丈→身の丈; 'one's body + height → height'): /mi + také → mi nó take/
  - uo + me → uo no me (魚+目→魚の目; 'a fish + an eye → a corn'): /ɯo + mé → ɯme no me ~ ɯo no mé/
  - ume + ki → ume no ki (梅+木→梅の木; 'Chinese plum + a tree → a plum tree'): /ɯme + kí → ɯme nó ki/
  - kaki + ki → kaki no ki (柿+木→柿の木; 'Japanese persimmon + a tree → a persimmon tree'): /kaki + kí → kaki nó ki/
  - kiri + ki → kiri no ki (桐+木→桐の木; 'princess tree + a tree → a princess tree'): /kiɾi + kí → kiɾi nó ki/
  - kuri + ki → kuri no ki (栗+木→栗の木; 'Japanese chestnut + a tree → a chestnu tree'): /kɯɾí + kí → kɯɾi nó ki/
  - hachi + ki → hachi no ki (鉢+木→鉢の木; 'a pot + a tree → a potted plant'): /hacɕí + kí → hacɕi nó ki ~ hacɕi no ki/
  - kō + tori → kō no tori (鸛+鳥→鸛; 'an Oriental stork + a bird → an Oriental stork'): /kóR + toɾi → koR nó toɾi ~ kóR no toɾi/
  - ichi + tori → ichi no Tori (一+酉→一の酉; 'the first + the Rooster → the first day of the Rooster Fair'): /icɕí + toɾi → icɕi no toɾi ~ icɕí no toɾi ~ icɕi nó toɾi/
  - ni + ashi → ni no ashi (二+足→二の足; 'the second + a foot → the second step → second thoughts'): /ní + aɕí → ni no aɕi/
  - yo ~ shi + zen → yo no zen ~ shi no zen (四+膳→四の膳; 'the fourth + a small Japanese dining table → the fourth serving'): /jó ~ ɕí + zeN → jo nó zeN ~ ɕi nó zeN/
  - hachi + ji → hachi no ji (八・８+字→八の字; 'eight ~ 8 + a character → the character 八 ~ the figure 8'): /hacɕí + ʑí → hacɕi nó ʑi/
  - ike + bō → Ike no Bō (池+坊→池坊; 'a pond + a Buddhist monk's room → Ike no Bō'): /iké + bóR → ike nó boR/
  - kuma + i → kuma no i (熊+胆→熊の胆; 'a bear + a gallbladder → a bear gallbladder'): /kɯmá ~ kɯ́ma + i ~ í → kɯma nó i/
  - kami + ke → kami no ke (髪+毛→髪の毛; 'headhair + hair → headhair'): /kamí + ke → kami nó ke/
  - kami + ku → kami no ku (上+句→上の句; 'the upper part + a phrase → the upper phrase'): /kámi + kɯ́ → kami nó kɯ ~ kámi no kɯ/
  - shimo + ku → shimo no ku (下+句→下の句; 'the lower part + a phrase → the lower phrase'): /ɕimó + kɯ́ → ɕimo nó kɯ ~ ɕimo no kɯ́/
  - e + gu → e no gu (絵+具→絵の具; 'a painting + a tool → paint'): /é + ɡɯ́ → e no ɡɯ/
  - yo + naka → yo no naka (世+中→世の中; 'the world + the middle → the world'): /jó ~ jo + náka → jo nó naka/
  - an + jō → an no jō (案+定→案の定; 'expectation + inevitability → just as expected'): /áN + ʑóR → aN nó ʑoR/
  - oku + in → oku no in (奥+院→奥の院; 'the deeper part + a temple → a garbhagriha'): /ókɯ + íN → okɯ nó iN/
  - gū + ne → gū no ne (ぐう+音→ぐうの音; '"hrrk" + a sound → the "hrrk" sound → dumbfoundedness'): /ɡɯ́R + ne → ɡɯR no ne ~ ɡɯR no né/
  - deku + bō → deku no bō (木偶+坊→木偶の坊; 'a wooden doll + a sonny → a blockhead'): /dékɯ + bóR → dekɯ nó boR/
  - hagi + mochi → hagi no mochi (萩+餅→萩の餅; 'bush clover + a mochi → an ohagi'): /háɡi ~ haɡi ~ haɡí + mocɕi → haɡi nó mocɕi ~ háɡi no mocɕi/
  - Higo + kami → Higo no Kami (肥後+守→肥後の守; 'Higo + chief → the Chief of Higo → a Higonokami knife'): /híɡo ~ hiɡó + kámi → hiɡo nó kami/

=== Noun + auxiliary ===
Auxiliaries following nouns can be classified into the following groups:

- Recessive and unaccented (Rec0): da
- Recessive and initial-accented (Rec+1): na no (da) / na n da, mitai (da)
- Recessive and penultimate-accented (Rec−2):
  - Modern: darō, desu / deshō, rashī ("seems like")
  - Classical: nari, rashi
- Dominant and penultimate-accented (Dom−2): rashī ("is typical of")
- Recessive or dominant, antepenultimate-accented, classical: gotoshi

Noun type			Rec0	Rec+1	Rec−2	Dom−2	gotoshi
Unaccented	ki (気; 'spirits')	/ki/	/ki da/	/ki mítai/	/ki ɾaɕíR, ki ɾáɕi/		/ki ɡótoɕi/
Unaccented	hashi (端; 'an edge')	/haɕi/	/haɕi da/	/haɕi mítai/	/haɕi ɾaɕíR, haɕi ɾáɕi/		/haɕi ɡótoɕi/
Unaccented	sakura (桜; 'a cherry blossom')	/sakɯɾa/	/sakɯɾa da/	/sakɯɾa mítai/	/sakɯɾa ɾaɕíR, sakɯɾa ɾáɕi/		/sakɯɾa ɡótoɕi/
Final-accented	hashi (橋; 'a bridge')	/haɕí/	/haɕí da/	/haɕí mitai/	/haɕí ɾaɕiR ~ haɕí | ɾaɕíR, haɕí ɾaɕi/	/haɕi ɾaɕíR/	/haɕí ɡotoɕi ~ haɕi ɡótoɕi/
Final-accented	yasumi (休み; 'rest')	/jasɯmí/	/jasɯmí da/	/jasɯmí mitai/	/jasɯmí ɾaɕiR ~ jasɯmí | ɾaɕíR, jasɯmí ɾaɕi/	/jasɯmi ɾaɕíR/	/haɕí ɡotoɕi ~ haɕi ɡótoɕi/
Medial-accented	okashi (お菓子; 'a sweet')	/okáɕi/	/okáɕi da/	/okáɕi mitai ~ okáɕi | mítai/	/okáɕi ɾaɕiR ~ okáɕi | ɾaɕíR, okáɕi ɾaɕi ~ okáɕi | ɾáɕi/	/okaɕi ɾaɕíR/	/okáɕi ɡotoɕi ~ okáɕi | ɡótoɕi ~ okaɕi ɡótoɕi/
Medial-accented	nomimono (飲み物; 'a drink')	/nomímono/	/nomímono da/	/nomímono mitai ~ nomímono | mítai/	/nomímono ɾaɕiR ~ nomímono | ɾaɕíR, nomímono ɾaɕi ~ nomímono | ɾáɕi/	/nomimono ɾaɕíR/	/nomímono ɡotoɕi ~ nomímono | ɡótoɕi ~ nomimono ɡótoɕi/
Medial-accented	mizuumi (湖; 'a lake')	/mizɯɯ́mi/	/mizɯɯ́mi da/	/mizɯɯ́mi mitai ~ mizɯɯ́mi | mítai/	/mizɯɯ́mi ɾaɕiR ~ mizɯɯ́mi | ɾaɕíR, mizɯɯ́mi ɾaɕi ~ mizɯɯ́mi | ɾáɕi/	/mizɯɯmi ɾaɕíR/	/mizɯɯ́mi ɡotoɕi ~ mizɯɯ́mi | ɡótoɕi ~ mizɯɯmi ɡótoɕi/
Initial-accented	ki (木; 'a tree')	/kí/	/kí da/	/kí mitai/	/kí ɾaɕiR ~ kí | ɾaɕíR, kí ɾaɕi/	/ki ɾaɕíR/	/kí ɡotoɕi ~ ki ɡótoɕi/
Initial-accented	hashi (箸; 'a chopstick')	/háɕi/	/háɕi da/	/háɕi mitai ~ háɕi | mítai/	/háɕi ɾaɕiR ~ háɕi | ɾaɕíR, háɕi ɾaɕi ~ háɕi | ɾáɕi/	/haɕi ɾaɕíR/	/háɕi ɡotoɕi ~ háɕi | ɡótoɕi ~ haɕi ɡótoɕi/
Initial-accented	midori (緑; 'green')	/mídoɾi/	/mídoɾi da/	/mídoɾi mitai ~ mídoɾi | mítai/	/mídoɾi ɾaɕiR ~ mídoɾi | ɾaɕíR, mídoɾi ɾaɕi ~ mídoɾi | ɾáɕi/	/midoɾi ɾaɕíR/	/mídoɾi ɡotoɕi ~ mídoɾi | ɡótoɕi ~ midoɾi ɡótoɕi/

==== Rashī ====
The adjectival suffix rashī has one accent type but two different behavior types depending on meaning:

- kare wa dō mo Nihonjin rashī (彼はどうも日本人らしい; 'he seems to be Japanese'): /káɾe wa | dóR mo | nihoNʑíN | ɾaɕíR/
- kare wa to te mo Nihonjin rashī (彼はとても日本人らしい; 'he is so typical of a Japanese person'): /káɾe wa to te mo | nihoNʑiN ɾaɕíR/

=== Formal nouns ===
Formal (Note: Not as in "non-casual," but as in "in form only." They are usually used to nominalize clauses. They can still be used as regular nouns with their original meanings.) nouns (形式名詞, keishiki meishi), such as koto (事; /kotó/ 'a thing; the fact that'), sei (所為; /séR/ 'as a result of'), tame (為; /tamé/ 'for the sake of'), tsumori (積もり; /tsɯmoɾi/ 'intends to'), tōri (通り; /tóRɾi/ 'just as'), toki (時; /tokí/ 'when'), tokoro (所; /tokoɾó/ 'where'), baai (場合; /baai/ 'if'), hazu (筈; /hazɯ/ 'ought to'), hō (方; /hóR/ 'on one's part'), mama (儘; /mamá/ 'this/that way'), mono (物; /monó/ 'the thing is'), yatsu (奴; /játsɯ/ 'the fact that'), wake (訳; /wáke/ 'the reason to/for') are usually weakened or complete dephrased (Japanese pitch accent § Weakening and major phrasing). Koto (事; /kotó/) and toki (時; /tokí/) can also become first-accented, especially after unaccented phrase:

- otona no + tame → otona no tame (大人の+為→大人のため; 'of adults + the sake → for adults'): /otona no + tamé → otona no tamé/
- suki na + koto → suki na koto (好きな+事→好きなこと; 'preferred + a thing → what one likes'): /sɯ̥kí na + kotó → sɯ̥kí na | kotó ~ sɯ̥kí na koto/
- sonna + koto → sonna koto (そんな+事→そんなこと; 'like that + a thing → that kind of thing'): /soNna + kotó → soNna kóto/
- sono + toki → sono toki (その+時→そのとき; 'that + time → that time'): /sono + tokí → sono tóki/
- chīsai + toki → chīsai toki (小さい+時→小さいとき; 'is small + time → when one was little'): /cɕiRsái + tokí → cɕiRsái | tóki/

=== Hi, ue, shita, uchi, hito and tokoro ===
The unaccented nouns hi (日; /hi/ 'a day'), ue (上; /ɯe/ 'the top side'), shita (下; /ɕi̥ta/ 'the bottom side'), uchi (内・家; /ɯcɕi/ 'the inside; a house'), hito (人; /hi̥to/ 'a person') and tokoro (所; /tokoɾo/ 'a place') become final-accented when they follow a non-compoundifying attributive modifier and precede a recessive and unaccented particle (wa, ga, ni, de, etc) or a copula (de aru → da, de arimasu → desu). If that modifier is accented, the noun and the particle or copula can break away into their own separate minor phrase.

- Unaccented modifier:
  - akuru + hi → akuru hi wa; akuru hi da (明くる+日→明くる日は・明くる日だ; 'upcoming + a day → as for the upcoming day; is the upcoming day'): /akɯɾɯ + hi → akɯɾɯ hí wa; akɯɾɯ hí da/
  - konna + hi → konna hi wa (こんな+日→こんな日に; 'like this + a day → on a day like this'): /koNna + hi → koNna hí ni/
  - shippai shita + hi → shippai shita hi ni wa (失敗した+日→失敗した日には; 'has failed + a day → as for on the day one fails'): /ɕi̥Qpai ɕi̥ta + hi → ɕi̥Qpai ɕi̥ta hí ni wa/
  - yasumi + no + hi → yasumi no hi wa (休み+の+日→休みの日は; 'rest + 's + a day → as for the day off'): /jasɯmí + no + hi → jasɯmi no hí wa/
  - mizu + no + ue → mizu no ue ni (水+の+上→水の上に; 'water + 's + the top side → over the water'): /mizɯ + no + ɯe → mizɯ no ɯé ni/
  - yama + no + ue → yama no ue ni; yama no ue desu (山+の+上→山の上に・山の上です; 'a mountain + 's + the top side → over the mountain; is over the mountain'): /jamá + no + ɯe → jama no ɯé ni; jama no ɯé desu/
  - hana + no + shita → hana no shita (鼻+の+下→鼻の下に; 'a nose + 's + the bottom side → under the nose'): /hana + no + ɕi̥ta → hana no ɕi̥tá ni/
  - hashi + no + shita → hashi no shita ni wa (橋+の+下→橋の下には; 'a bridge + 's + the bottom side → as for under the bridge'): /haɕí + no + ɕi̥ta → haɕi no ɕi̥tá ni wa/
  - tonari + no + uchi → tonari no uchi kara; tonari no uchi da (隣+の+家→隣の家から・隣の家だ; 'one's neighbor + 's + a house → from the neighbor's house; is the neighbor's house'): /tonaɾi + no + ɯcɕi → tonaɾi no ɯcɕí̥ kaɾa; tonaɾi no ɯcɕí da/
  - shiranai + hito → shiranai hito ga (知らない+人→知らない人が; 'hasn't gotten to know + a person → the person one doesn't know'): /ɕiɾanai + hi̥to → ɕiɾanai hi̥tó ɡa/
  - onna + no + hito → onna no hito ga; onna no hito desu (女+の+人→女の人が・女の人です; 'a female person + a person → the woman; is the woman'): /oNná + no + hi̥to → oNna no hi̥tó ɡa; oNna no hi̥tó desu/
  - uchi + no + hito → uchi no hito ga (家+の+人→家の人が; 'my house + 's + a person → my husband'): /ɯcɕi + no + hi̥to → ɯcɕi no hi̥tó ɡa/
  - anna + tokoro → anna tokoro ni (あんな+所→あんな所に; 'like that far from you and me + a place → in the place that far from you and me'): /aNna + tokoɾo → aNna tokoɾó ni/
  - onaji + tokoro → onaji tokoro e (同じ+所→同じ所へ; 'the same + a place → to the same place'): /onaʑi + tokoɾo → onaʑi tokoɾó e/
  - tomodachi + no + tokoro → tomodachi no tokoro ni (友達+の+所→友達の所に; 'a friend + 's + a place → at the friend's place'): /tomodacɕi no + tokoɾo → tomodacɕi no tokoɾó ni/
- Accented modifier:
  - saigo + no + hi → saigo no hi wa (最後+の+日→最後の日は; 'final + 's + a day → as for the final day'): /sáiɡo + no + hi → sáiɡo no | hí wa/
  - iya ga + ue → iya ga ue ni mo (弥が+上→弥が上にも; 'more and more + the top side → all the more'): /ijá ɡa + ɯe → ijá ɡa | ɯé ni mo/
  - ki + no + ue → ki no ue ni (木+の+上→木の上に; 'a tree + 's + the top side → over the tree'): /kí + no + ɯe → kí no | ɯé ni/
  - aozora + no + shita → aozora no shita de (青空+の+下→青空の下で; 'the blue sky + 's + the bottom side → under the blue sky'): /aozóɾa + no + ɕi̥ta → aozóɾa no | ɕi̥tá de/
  - anata + no + uchi → anata no uchi ni (貴方+の+家→貴方の家に; 'you + 's + a house → at your house'): /anáta + no + ɯcɕi → anáta no | ɯcɕí ni/
  - ōzei + no + hito → ōzei no hito ga (大勢+の+人→大勢の人が; 'a flock + 's + a person → the flock of people'): /oRzéi + no + hi̥to → oRzéi no | hi̥tó ɡa/
  - sensei + no + tokoro → sensei no tokoro de (先生+の+所→先生の所で; 'a teacher + 's + place → the teacher's place'): /seNséi + no + tokoɾo → seNséi no | tokoɾó de/

=== Clippings ===
==== Clipped simplexes ====
Trimoraic or shorter clippings tend to be initial-accented:

- keizai → kei (経済→経; 'an economy'): /kéizai → kéi/
- shamisen → shami ~ samisen → sami (三味線→三味): /ɕamiseN → ɕámi ~ samiseN → sámi/
- mukuinu → muku (尨犬→尨; 'a shaggy dog'): /mɯkɯinɯ → mɯ́kɯ/
- mochiron → mochi (勿論→もち; 'a matter of course'): /mocɕíɾoN → mócɕi/
- chokorēto → choko (チョコレート→チョコ; 'chocolate'): /cɕokoɾéRto → cɕóko/
- birudingu → biru (ビルディング→ビル; 'a building'): /bíɾɯdiNɡɯ → bíɾɯ/
- rokēshon → roke (ロケーション→ロケ; 'a location'): /ɾokéRɕoN → ɾóke/
- shōchū → chū (焼酎→酎): /ɕoRcɕɯ́R → cɕɯ́R/
- bifuteki → teki (ビフテキ→テキ; 'beefsteak → steak'): /biɸɯ̥teki → téki/
- animēshon → anime (アニメーション→アニメ; 'animation'): /animéRɕoN → ánime ~ anime/
- pāmanento → pāma (パーマネント→パーマ; 'a permanent → a perm'): /paRmanéNto → páRma/
- handikyappu → hande ~ handi (ハンディキャップ→ハンデ(ィ); 'a handicap'): /handikjáQpɯ → háNde ~ háNdi/
- maikurohon → maiku (マイクロホン→マイク; 'a microphone → a mic'): /maikɯɾóhoN → máikɯ/
- daiyamondo → daiya (ダイヤモンド→ダイヤ; 'diamond'): /daijamóNdo → dáija ~ daija/
- buranketto → ketto (ブランケット→ケット; 'a blanket'): /bɯɾáNkeQto → kéQto ~ keQto/
- purattohōmu → hōmu (プラットホーム→ホーム; 'a railway platform'): /pɯɾaQtohóRmɯ → hóRmɯ/

Most quadrimoraic clippings are unaccented recent loanwords:

- asuparagasu → asupara (アスパラガス→アスパラ; 'asparagus'): /asɯ̥paɾáɡasɯ → asɯ̥paɾa/
- anakuronizumu → anakuro (アナクロニズム→アナクロ; 'an anachronism'): /anakɯɾonízɯmɯ → anakɯɾo/
- intorodakushon → intoro (イントロダクション→イントロ; 'an introduction → an intro'): /iNtoɾodákɯ̥ɕoN → iNtoɾo/
- infurēshon → infure (インフレーション→インフレ; 'inflation'): /iNɸɯɾéRɕoN → iNɸɯɾe/
- konbiniensu sutoa → konbini (コンビニエンスストア→コンビニ; 'a convenience store'): /koNbinieNsɯ sɯ̥tóa → koNbini/
- bātendā → bāten (バーテンダー→バーテン; 'a bartender'): /baRtéNdaR → baRteN/
- rihabiritēshon → rihabiri (リハビリテーション→リハビリ; 'rehabilitation → rehab'): /ɾihabiɾitéRɕoN → ɾihabiɾi/

==== Clipped compounds ====
Bimoraic clippings, trimoraic Sino-Japanese clippings, and new recent-loanword clippings tend to be initial-accented:

- Kojiki + Nihon Shoki → Kiki (古事記+日本書紀→記紀; 'the Records of Ancient Matters and Chronicles of Japan'): /kóʑiki + nihoN ɕóki → kí̥ki → ki̥kí/
- bēsu appu → bea (ベースアップ→ベア; 'a basic-pay raise'): /beRsɯ áQpɯ → béa/
- modan gāru → moga (モダンガール→モガ; 'a modern girl'): /modaN ɡáRɾɯ → móɡa/
- modan bōi → mobo (モダンボーイ→モボ; 'a modern boy'): /modaN bóRi → móbo/
- Togikai giin → Togi (都議会議員→都議; 'a member of the Tokyo Metropolitan Assembly'): /toɡikai ɡíiN → tóɡi/
- kengikai giin → kengi (県議会議員→県議; 'a member of a prefectural assembly'): /keNɡikai ɡíiN → kéNɡi/
- kenkō hoken → kenpo (健康保険→健保; 'health insurance'): /keNkoR hókeN → kéNpo/
- rōdō kumiai → rōso (労働組合→労組; 'a labor union'): /ɾoRdoR kɯ́miai → ɾóRso/
- seikatsu kyōdō kumiai → seikyō (生活協同組合→生協; 'a consumers' cooperative'): /seikatsɯ̥ kjoRdoR kɯ́miai → seikjoR ~ séikjoR/
- tsūshin hanbai → tsūhan (通信販売→通販; 'mail order'): /tsɯRɕiN háNbai → tsɯRhaN ~ tsɯ́RhaN/
- tēpu rekōdā → tereko (テープレコーダー→テレコ; 'a tape recorder'): /teRpɯ ɾekóRdaR → téɾeko/

Compound-derived clippings with daigaku → dai (大学→大; /daiɡakɯ → dái/ 'a university') tend to be unaccented:

- shiritsu daigaku → shidai (私立大学→私大; 'a private university'): /ɕiɾitsɯ dáiɡakɯ → ɕidai/
- Tōkyō daigaku → Tōdai (東京大学→東大; 'the University of Tokyo'): /toRkjoR dáiɡakɯ → toRdai/
- Toritsu daigaku → Toritsudai (都立大学→都立大; 'a Tokyo-run university'): /toɾitsɯ dáiɡakɯ → toɾitsɯdai/
- joshi daigaku → joshidai (女子大学→女子大; 'a women's university'): /ʑoɕi dáiɡakɯ → ʑoɕidai/

Quadrimoraic clippings tend to be unaccented:

- unagidonburi → unadon (鰻丼): /ɯnaɡi dóNbɯɾi → ɯnadoN/
- gakusei waribiki → gakuwari (学生割引→学割; 'a student discount'): /ɡakɯ̥sei wáɾibiki → ɡakɯwaɾi/
- kōtō gakkō → kōkō (高等学校→高校; 'a senior high school → a senior high'): /koRtoR ɡáQkoR → koRkoR/
- Kokusai Rengō → Kokuren (国際連合→国連; 'the United Nations → the UN'): /kokɯ̥sai ɾéNɡoR → kokɯɾeN/
- rōdō kumiai → rōkumi (労働組合→労組; 'a labor union → a union'): /ɾoRdoR kɯ́miai → ɾoRkɯmi/
- rusuban denwa → rusuden (留守番電話→留守電; 'an answerphone'): /ɾɯsɯbaN déNwa → ɾɯsɯdeN/
- arukōru chūdoku (アルコール中毒→アル中; 'alcohol poisoning'): /aɾɯkoRɾɯ cɕɯ́Rdokɯ → aɾɯcɕɯR/
- ea kondishoningu, ea kondishonā (エアコンディショニング・エアコンディショナー→エアコン; 'air conditioning, an air conditioner → aircon'): /ea koNdíɕoniNɡɯ, ea koNdíɕonaR → eakoN/
- sekondo hando (セコンドハンド→セコハン; 'second hand'): /sekoNdo háNdo → sekohaN/
- hangā sutoraiki → hansuto (ハンガーストライキ→ハンスト; 'a hunger strike'): /haNɡaR sɯ̥toɾáiki → haNsɯ̥to/
- pantī sutokkingu → pansuto (パンティーストッキング→パンスト; 'pantyhose'): /paNtiR sɯ̥tóQkiNɡɯ → paNsɯ̥to/
- famirī resutoran → famiresu (ファミリーレストラン→ファミレス; 'a family restaurant'): /ɸamiɾiR résɯ̥toɾaN → ɸamiɾesɯ/
- masu komyunikēshon → masukomi (マスコミュニケーション→マスコミ; 'mass communication'): /masɯ̥ komjɯnikéRɕoN → masɯ̥komi/
- {sekusharu ~ sekushuaru} harasumento → sekuhara ({セクシャル・セクシュアル}ハラスメント→セクハラ; 'sexual harassment'): /{sekɯ̥ɕaɾɯ ~ sekɯ̥ɕɯaɾɯ} haɾásɯmeNto → sekɯ̥haɾa/
- raito noberu → ra(i)nobe (ライトノベル→ラ(イ)ノベ; 'a light novel'): /ɾaito nóbeɾɯ → ɾa(i)nobe/
- rajio kasetto → rajikase (ラジオカセット→ラジカセ; 'a radio-cassette recorder'): /ɾaʑio kaséQto ~ ɾaʑio káseQto → ɾaʑikase/
- rimōto kontorōru → rimokon (リモートコントロール→リモコン; 'a remote control → a remote'): /ɾimoRto kontoɾóRɾɯ → ɾimokoN/

Quinquemoraic or longer clippings tend to be antepenultimate-accented:

- Nihon Kyōikuin Kumiai → Nikkyōso (日本教職員組合→日教組; 'the Japan Teachers' Union'): /niQkjóRso/
- Nippon Keieisha Dantai Renmei → Nikkeiren (日本経営者団体連盟→日経連; 'the Japan Federation of Employers' Associations'): /niQkéiɾeN/
- disuinfurēshon → disuinfure (ディスインフレーション→ディスインフレ; 'disinflation'): /disɯiNɸɯɾéRɕoN → disɯíNɸɯɾe/

== Bibliography ==
- Akinaga, Kazue (20 December 1998) [25 April 1998]. 共通語のアクセント. In NHK Broadcasting Culture Research Institute (ed.). NHK日本語発音アクセント辞典 新版 (in Japanese) (5th ed.). Shibuya, Tokyo: NHK Publishing. pp. 174–221. ISBN 4-14-011112-7.
- Hayata, Teruhiro (28 February 1986). "The prosodic unit of Japanese, especially on the bearer of accent" アクセントの単位―特にその担い手について (PDF). Studies in Literature 文學研究 (in Japanese). 83. Faculty of Literature, Kyushu University: 115–147. doi:10.15017/2332627.
- Hirayama, Teruo, ed. (15 September 2010) [30 June 1960]. 全国アクセント辞典 (in Japanese) (31st ed.). Chiyoda, Tokyo: Tokyodo Shuppan. ISBN 978-4-490-10023-5.
- Kindaichi, Haruhiko; Akinaga, Kazue, eds. (1 April 2025) [10 April 2014]. 新明解日本語アクセント辞典 (in Japanese) (2nd ed.). Chiyoda, Tokyo: Sanseido. ISBN 978-4-385-13468-0.
- Kawahara, Shigeto (2015). "11 The phonology of Japanese accent". In Kubozono, Haruo; Shibatani, Masayoshi; Kageyama, Tarō (eds.). Handbook of Japanese Phonetics and Phonology (PDF). Handbooks of Japanese Language and Linguistics. Vol. 2. Berlin; Munich; Boston: De Gruyter Mouton. pp. 445–492. ISBN 978-1-61451-252-3.
- Kōri, Shirō (1 September 2024) [1 May 2020]. 日(に)本(ほん)語(ご)のイントネーション――しくみと音(おん)読(どく)・朗(ろう)読(どく)への応(おう)用(よう) (in Japanese) (2nd ed.). Bunkyō, Tokyo: Taishukan. ISBN 978-4-469-21379-9.
- Kubozono, Haruo (2002) [1999]. "2. Mora and Syllable". In Tsujimura, Natsuko (ed.). The Handbook of Japanese Linguistics. Malden, Massachusetts; Oxford: Blackwell Publishers. pp. 31–61. ISBN 0-631-23494-2.
- Kubozono, Haruo (11 January 2018) [5 April 2006]. アクセントの法則. 岩波科学ライブラリー (in Japanese). Vol. 118 (on-demand ed.). Chiyoda, Tokyo: Iwanami Shoten. ISBN 978-4-00-730719-5.
- Labrune, Laurence (2012). The Phonology of Japanese. Oxford; New York: Oxford University Press. ISBN 978-0-19-9545834.
- Martin, Samuel Elmo (2004) [1975]. A Reference Grammar of Japanese (revised ed.). Honolulu: University of Hawai'i Press. ISBN 0-8248-2818-6.
- Matsumori, Akiko (1 May 2026) [20 September 2012]. An Introduction to Japanese Accent 日本語アクセント入門 (in Japanese) (3rd ed.). Chiyoda, Tokyo: Sanseido. pp. 46–60, 124–144. ISBN 978-4-385-36531-2.
- Nakai, Yukihiko (1 May 2026) [20 September 2012]. 第10章 複合語のアクセント（１）. An Introduction to Japanese Accent 日本語アクセント入門 (in Japanese) (3rd ed.). Chiyoda, Tokyo: Sanseido. pp. 146–163. ISBN 978-4-385-36531-2.
- NHK Broadcasting Culture Research Institute, ed. (10 November 1986) [10 June 1985]. NHK編 日本語発音アクセント辞典 改訂新版 (in Japanese) (6th ed.). Shibuya, Tokyo: NHK Publishing. ISBN 4-14-011040-6.
- NHK Broadcasting Culture Research Institute, ed. (20 June 2025) [25 May 2016]. NHK日本語発音アクセント新辞典 (in Japanese) (15th ed.). Shibuya, Tokyo: NHK Publishing. ISBN 978-4-14-011345-5.
- Poser, William John (1984). The Phonetics and Phonology of Tone and Intonation in Japanese (doctoral thesis). Cambridge, Massachusetts: Massachusetts Institute of Technology.
- Tanaka, Ishiki (1 January 2017). "Evolution to "NHK's New Dictionary of Japanese Pronunciation and Accentuation" [Part VII]: Pronunciation and Accentuation of Compound Nouns: The Purpose of the New Dictionary and Accentuation Rules" NHKアクセント辞典"新辞典"への大改訂⑦ 複合名詞の発音とアクセント ～『新辞典』のねらいとアクセント規則～ (PDF). The NHK Monthly Report on Broadcast Research 放送研究と調査. 67 (1). NHK Broadcasting Culture Research Institute: 54–63.
- Vance, Timothy John (1987). An Introduction to Japanese Phonology. Albany, New York: State University of New York Press. ISBN 0-88706-360-8.
- Vance, Timothy John (October 2008). The Sounds of Japanese with Audio CD. Cambridge; New York: Cambridge University Press. ISBN 978-0-521-61754-3.
