= Japanese pitch accent rules (affixes) =

This article is an non-exhaustive list of rules that govern the Tokyo pitch accent of affixes. For other rules, see Japanese pitch accent rules.

== Prefixes ==
=== Native prefixes ===
The prefixes ki‑ (生; /kí/ 'pure'), su‑ (素; /sɯ́/ 'bare'), fu‑/bu‑ (不; 'un‑') and ma‑ (真(っ); /ma(Q)/ 'true ~ right in the middle') can form regular long compounds:

- musume → kimusume (娘→生娘; 'a girl → a virgin'): /mɯsɯmé → ki-mɯ́sɯme/
- odori → suodori (踊り→素踊り; 'dance → dance in plain kimono'): /odoɾi → sɯ-ódoɾi/
- chōnin → suchōnin (町人→素町人; 'a townsman → a mere plebeian'): /cɕoRniN ~ cɕóRniN → sɯ̥-cɕóRniN/
- chōhō → buchōhō (調法→不調法; 'handy → awkward'): /cɕoRhoR ~ cɕóRhoR → bɯ-cɕóRhoR/
- ushiro → maushiro (後ろ→真後ろ; 'behind → right behind'): /ɯɕiɾo → ma-ɯ́ɕiɾo/
- mukai → mamukai (向かい→真向かい; 'opposite → exactly opposite; right in front'): /mɯkai → ma-mɯ́kai/
- mukō → mamukō (向こう→真向こう; 'opposite → exactly opposite; right in front'): /mɯkóR ~ mɯkoR → ma-mɯ́koR/
- omote → maomote (表→真表; 'the front side → straight ahead'): /omoté → ma-ómote/
- yonaka → mayonaka (夜中→真夜中; 'midnight → the dead of night'): /jonaká → ma-jónaka/
- shikaku → mashikaku (四角→真四角; 'a quadrilateral → a perfect square'): /ɕi̥kakɯ́ → ma-ɕí̥kakɯ → ma-ɕi̥kákɯ/
- shōmen → mashōmen (正面→真正面; 'straight ahead → dead straight ahead'): /ɕoRméN → ma-ɕóRmeN ~ ma-ɕoRméN/
- saki → massaki (先→真っ先; 'the beginning → the very beginning'): /saki → maQ-sáki ~ maQ-sakí/
- hadaka → mappadaka (裸→真っ裸; 'naked → buck naked'): /hadaka → maQ-pádaka/
- taira → mattaira (平ら→真っ平ら; 'flat → perfectly flat'): /taiɾa → maQ-táiɾa/
- sakasama → massakasama (逆様→真っ逆様; 'inverse → exactly inverse'): /sakasama → maQ-sákasama/
- futatsu → mapputatsu (二つ→真っ二つ; '2 things → exactly 2 halves'): /ɸɯ̥tatsɯ́ → maQ-pɯ̥́tatsɯ → maQ-pɯ̥tátsɯ/
- hiruma → mappiruma (昼間→真っ昼間; 'daytime → broad daylight'): /hiɾɯmá → maQ-píɾɯma/
- shikaku → masshikaku (四角→真っ四角; 'a quadrilateral → a perfect square'): /ɕi̥kakɯ́ → maQ-ɕí̥kakɯ → maQ-ɕi̥kákɯ/
- shōmen → masshōmen (正面→真っ正面; 'straight ahead → dead straight ahead'): /ɕoRméN → maQ-ɕóRmeN ~ maQ-ɕoRméN/
- kuro → makkuro (黒→真っ黒; 'black → pitch black'): /kɯ́ɾo → maQ-kɯ́ɾo/
- shiro → masshiro (白→真っ白; 'white → pure white'): /ɕíɾo → maQ-ɕíɾo/
- ao → massao (青→真っ青; 'blue → deep blue'): /áo → maQ-sáo/
  - But: aka → makka (赤→真っ赤; 'red → deep red'): /áka → maQ-ká/
- sugu → massugu (直ぐ→真っ直ぐ; 'straight → dead straight'): /sɯ́ɡɯ → maQ-sɯ́ɡɯ/
- saichū → massaichū (最中→真っ最中; 'in the very middle → right in the very middle'): /sáicɕɯR → maQ-sáicɕɯR/

Short compounds with su‑ and fu‑/bu‑ tend to be initial-accented:

- ashi → suashi (足→素足; 'a foot → a bare foot'): /aɕí → sɯ́-aɕi/
- kao → sugao (顔→素顔; 'a face → a bare face'): /kao → sɯ́-ɡao/
- hada → suhada (肌→素肌; 'skin → bare skin'): /háda → sɯ́-hada/
- muki → fumuki (向き→不向き; 'suitability → unsuitability'): /mɯ́ki → ɸɯ́-mɯki/
- nare → funare (慣れ→不慣れ; 'experience → inexperience'): /naɾé → ɸɯ́-naɾe/
- suki → busuki (好き→不好き; 'like → dislike'): /sɯ̥kí → bɯ́-sɯ̥ki/

Short compounds with ma‑, on the other hand, tend to be unaccented:

- mizu → mamizu (水→真水; 'water → freshwater'): /mizɯ → ma-mizɯ/
- yoko → mayoko (横→真横; 'the side → right beside'): /joko → ma-joko ~ ma-jokó/
- ura → maura (裏→真裏; 'the back side → right behind'): /ɯɾá → ma-ɯɾa/
- natsu → manatsu (夏→真夏; 'summer → midsummer'): /natsɯ́ → ma-natsɯ/
- fuyu → mafuyu (冬→真冬; 'summer → midwinter'): /ɸɯjɯ́ → ma-ɸɯjɯ/
- hiru → mahiru (昼→真昼; 'noon → midday'): /hiɾɯ́ → ma-hiɾɯ/
- naka → manaka (中→真中; 'the middle → right in the middle'): /náka → ma-naka ~ má-naka/
- But:
  - ue → maue (上→真上; 'above → right above'): /ɯe → ma-ɯé/
  - shita → mashita (下→真下; 'below → right below'): /ɕi̥ta → ma-ɕi̥tá/

Some prefixes may not affect the original accent of the prefixed components, while others add accent:

- mae → manmae (前→真ん前; 'the front → right in front'): /máe → maN-máe/
  - But: naka → mannaka (中→真ん中; 'the middle → right in the middle'): /náka → maN-naka/
- maru → manmaru (丸→真ん丸; 'a circle → a perfect circle'): /maɾɯ → maN-maɾɯ ~ maN-máɾɯ/
- marui → manmarui (丸い→真ん丸い; 'is round → is perfectly round'): /maɾɯi ~ maɾɯ́i → maN-maɾɯi ~ maN-maɾɯ́i/
- yowai → kayowai (弱い→か弱い; 'is weak → is frail'): /jowái → ka-jowái/
- futoi → zubutoi (太い→図太い; 'is brazen → is very brazen'): /ɸɯ̥tói → zɯ-bɯtói/
- osoroshī → soraosoroshī (恐ろしい→空恐ろしい; 'is dreadful → is ominously dreadful'): /osoɾoɕíR → soɾa-osoɾoɕíR/
- hashiru → tabashiru (走る→た走る・迸る; 'runs → cascades'): /haɕíɾɯ → ta-baɕíɾɯ/

Emphatic prefixes, especially those that express contempt or antagonism, such as ai‑ (相; /ái/ 'reciprocal'), nama‑ (生; /náma/ 'fresh'), ō-/dai- (大; /dái/ 'big'), ko‑ (小; 'little'), etc tend to result in initial-accented compounds, although younger speakers may regularize them (the dagger ^{†} marks obsolete or obsolescent accent):

- tsugu → aitsugu (次ぐ→相次ぐ; 'happens next → happens in continuous succession'): /tsɯɡɯ → ái-tsɯɡɯ/
- yasashī → namayasashī (易しい→生易しい; 'is simple → is plain simple'): /jasaɕiR ~ jasaɕíR → nama-jasaɕiR ~ nama-jasaɕíR ~ náma-jasaɕiR/
- hyōhō → namabyōhō (兵法→生兵法; 'the art of war → superficial knowledge of the art of war'): /hjóRhoR → nama-bjóRhoR ~ ^{†}náma-bjoRhoR/
- shiroi → namatchiroi (白い→生っ白い; 'is white → is pasty'): /ɕiɾói → namaQ-cɕiɾói ~ ^{†}námaQ-cɕiɾoi/
- zūzūshī → ikezūzūshī (図々しい→いけ図々しい; 'is brazen → is utterly brazen'): /zɯzɯɕíR → ike-zɯzɯɕíR ~ íke-zɯzɯɕiR/
- urusai → kourusai (煩い→小煩い; 'is pesky → is frustratingly pesky'): /ɯɾɯsái → ko-ɯɾɯsái ~ ko-ɯɾɯsai ~ kó-ɯɾɯsai/
- yakamashī → koyakamashī (喧しい→小喧しい; 'is fussy → is annoyingly fussy'): /jakamaɕíR → ko-jakamaɕíR ~ ko-jakamaɕiR ~ kó-jakamaɕiR/
- mendō → komendō (面倒→小面倒; 'irksome → triflingly irksome'): /meNdóR → ko-meNdóR ~ kó-meNdoR/
- namaiki → konamaiki (生意気→小生意気; 'cheeky → annoyingly cheeky'): /namaiki → ko-namáiki ~ ko-námaiki ~ kó-namaiki/
- ichijikan → koichijikan (一時間→小一時間; 'an hour → just about an hour'): /icɕiʑíkaN → ko-icɕiʑíkaN ~ kó-icɕiʑikaN/
- baka → ōbaka (馬鹿→大馬鹿; 'an idiot → an utter moron'): /báka → oR-baka ~ oR-báka ~ óR-baka/
- kirai → daikirai (嫌い→大嫌い; 'hate → loathsome'): /kiɾai → dái-kiɾai/
- suki → daisuki (好き→大好き; 'like → beloved'): /sɯ̥kí → dái-sɯ̥ki/

Ko‑ without such a negative connotation can make initial-accented or unaccented short compounds:

- kabu → kokabu (蕪→小蕪; 'turnip → small turnip'): /kabɯ → kó-kabɯ/
- michi → komichi (道→小道; 'a road → a narrow road'): /micɕi → kó-micɕi ~ ko-micɕi/
- tachi → kodachi (太刀→小太刀): /tácɕi → kó-dacɕi/
- aza → koaza (字→小字): /áza → ko-aza/
- uta → kouta (唄→小唄; 'a song → a kouta'): /ɯtá → ko-ɯta/
- uma → kouma (馬→小馬; 'a horse → a foal'): /ɯmá → ko-ɯma/
- yubi → koyubi (指→小指; 'a finger → a little finger'): /jɯbí → ko-jɯbi/

Ō‑ otherwise still often results in initial-accented short compounds:

- to → ōdo (戸→大戸; 'a door → the big main door'): /to → óR-do ~ oR-do/
- ya → ōya (家→大家; 'a dealer → a landlord'): /já → óR-ja/
- kawa → ōkawa (川→大川; 'a river → a large river'): /kawá → óR-kawa/
- shio → ōshio (潮→大潮; 'a tide → a spring tide'): /ɕió → óR-ɕio ~ oR-ɕio/
- aza → ōaza (字→大字): /áza → óR-aza/
- kami → ōkami (神→大神・狼; 'a god → a great god; a wolf'): /kámi → óR-kami ~ oR-kami; óR-kami/

Ai‑ and moto‑ (元; /móto/ 'former') can form non-compoundified compounds:

- taisuru → ai taisuru (対する→相対する; 'confronts → confronts one another'): /taisɯ́ɾɯ → ái | taisɯ́ɾɯ/
- daijin → moto daijin (大臣→元大臣; 'a minister → a former minister'): /dáiʑiN → móto | dáiʑiN/

=== Sino-Japanese prefixes ===
A number of Sino-Japanese prefixes are prone to make initial-accented or non-compoundified compounds:

- kaku‑ (各; /kákɯ/ 'various'): kakujin (各人; /kákɯʑiN/ 'people'), kakusho (各所; /kákɯ̥ɕo/ 'places'), kaku kojin (各個人; /kákɯ̥ | kóʑiN/ 'individuals'), etc.
- ki‑ (貴; /kí/ 'esteemed'): kijo (貴女; /kíʑo/ 'a lady'), kiden (貴殿・貴兄; /kídeN; kí̥kei → ki̥kéi/ 'you, my esteemed male addressee'), ki shokan (貴書簡; /kí̥ (|) ɕokaN/ 'your esteemed letter to me'), etc.
- kyū‑ (旧; /kjɯ́R/ 'old'): kyūka (旧家; /kjɯ́Rka ~ kjɯRka/ 'a long-standing family'), kyūkabu (旧株; /kjɯ́kabɯ/ 'an old stock'), Kyūkyō (旧教; /kjɯ́RkjoR/ 'Catholicism'), kyūha (旧派; /kjɯ́Rha/ 'an old school/movement'), etc.
- gen‑ (現; /ɡéN/ 'current'): gendai (現代; /ɡéNdai/ 'the post-WW2 modern era'), gen shushō (現首相; /ɡéN (|) ɕɯɕoR ~ ɡéN (|) ɕɯ̥ɕoR/ 'the incumbent Prime Minister'), etc.
- ko‑ (故; /kó/ 'the late'): kojin (故人; /kóʑiN/ 'the deceased'), ko Taikan (故大観; /kó | táikaN/ 'the late Taikan'), etc.
- kon‑ (今; /kóN/ 'now'): konji (今時; /kóNʑi/ 'these days'), kondo (今度; /kóNdo/ 'the latest'), konnichi (今日; /kóNnicɕi/ 'today'), konnen (今年; /kóNneN/ 'this year'), konban (今晩; /kóNbaN/ 'this evening'), kon dankai (今段階; /kóN (|) daNkai/ 'this stage'), etc.
- jun‑ (純; /ʑɯ́N/ 'pure'): jun Nihonfū (純日本風; /ʑɯ́N (|) nihoNɸɯR/ 'a purely Japanese style'), etc.
- sho‑ (諸; 'various'): shokei; shoshi (諸兄・諸氏; /ɕókei; ɕóɕi/ 'you gentlemen'), etc.
- shin‑ (新; /ɕíN/ 'new'): shinkabu (新株; /ɕíNkabɯ/ 'a new stock'), shinkyū (新旧; /ɕíNkjɯR/ 'old and new'), Shinkyō (新教; /ɕíNkjoR/ 'Protestantism'), shingetsu (新月; /ɕíNɡetsɯ/ 'a new moon'), shintō (新党; /ɕíNtoR ~ ɕiNtoR/ 'a new political party'), shinnen (新年; /ɕíNneN/ 'a new year'), shinpa (新派; /ɕíNpa/ 'a new school/movement'), etc.
- sen‑ (先; /séN/ 'prior'): sengetsu (先月; /séNɡetsɯ/ 'last month'), sendo (先度; /séNdo ~ seNdo/ 'the other day'), senban (先晩; /séNbaN ~ seNbaN/ 'the other evening'), sen'ya (先夜; /séNja ~ seNja/ 'the other night'), etc.
- zen‑ (前; /zéN/ 'previous'): zense; zensei (前世; /zéNse; zéNsei/ 'the previous life; the former time'), zen shūshō (前首相; /zéN (|) ɕɯɕoR ~ zéN (|) ɕɯ̥ɕoR/ 'a former prime minister'), etc.
- zen‑ (全; /zéN/ 'all'): zenkō (全校; /zéNkoR ~ zeNkoR/ 'all (the) school(s)'), zen gakusei (全学生; /zéN (|) ɡakɯ̥sei/ 'all (the) student(s)'), zen Nippon (全日本; /zéN | niQpóN ~ zéN-niQpoN ~ zeN-niQpóN/ 'all Japan'), zensekai (全世界; /zéN-sekai ~ zeN-sékai/ 'the whole world'), etc.
- son‑ (尊; /sóN/ 'esteemed'): sonpu (尊父; /sóNpɯ/ 'your esteemed father'), sonbo (尊母; /sóNbo/ 'your esteemed mother'), sonkei (尊兄; /sóNkei/ 'your esteemed elder brother ~ you, my esteemed male addressee'), etc.
- chō‑ (超; /cɕóR/ 'super‑'): chō kokka shugi (超国家主義; /cɕoR-koQka ɕɯ́ɡi ~ cɕóR | koQka ɕɯ́ɡi/ 'ultranationalism'), etc.
- tō‑ (当; /tóR/ 'in question'): tōsha (当社; /tóRɕa/ 'the company/Shinto shrine in question'), tōnin (当人; /tóRniN/ 'the person in question'), tō kaijō (当会場; /tóR (|) kaiʑoR/ 'the venue in question'), etc.
- han‑ (反; /háN/ 'anti‑'): han shakaiteki (反社会的; /haN-ɕakaiteki ~ háN (|) ɕakaiteki/ 'antisocial'), etc.
- hi‑ (非; /hí/ 'un‑'): hi shakōteki (非社交的; /hí (|) ɕakoRteki/ 'unsociable'), etc.
- bō‑ (某; /bóR/ 'a certain'): bōjitsu (某日; /bóRʑitsɯ/ 'a certain day'), bōjo (某女; /bóRʑo/ 'a certain female person'), bō hōmen (某方面; /bóR | hoRméN ~ bóR-hoRmeN/ 'a certain corner'), etc.
- hon‑ (本; /hóN/ 'this'): honshi (本誌; /hóNɕi/ 'this periodical'), honjitsu (本日; /hóNʑitsɯ/ 'today'), hon taikai (本大会; /hóN (|) taikai/ 'this tournament'), etc.
- myō‑ (明; /mjóR ~ mjoR/ 'next'): myōnichi (明日; /mjóRnicɕi/ 'tomorrow'), myōnen (明年; /mjóRneN ~ mjoRneN/ 'next year'), myōban (明晩; /mjóRbaN/ 'tomorrow evening'), myōya (明夜; /mjóRja/ 'tomorrow night'), etc.
- ryō‑ (両; /ɾjóR/ 'both'): ryōnin (両人; /ɾjóRniN/ 'both people'), ryōke (両家; /ɾjóRke/ 'both families'), etc.

Some compounds with dō‑ (同; /dóR/) may have different accent patterns depending on the different meanings, namely 'aforementioned' and 'the same':

- dōji (同時; /doRʑi ~ dóRʑi/ 'the same time/hour'), etc.
- dōchi (同地; /dóRcɕi/ 'the said locality ~ the same locality'), etc.
- dōgetsu (同月; /dóRɡetsɯ; doRɡetsɯ/ 'the said month; the same month'), dōjitsu (同日; /dóRʑitsɯ; doRʑitsɯ/ 'the said day; the same day'), dōnen (同年; /dóRneN; doRneN/ 'the said year; the same year/age'), dōken (同県; /dóRkeN; doRkeN/ 'the said prefecture; the same prefecture'), dōkō (同校; /dóRkoR; doRkoR/ 'the said school; the same school'), dōtō (同党; /dóRtoR; doRtoR/ 'the said political party; the same political party'), dōnin; dōnin ~ dōjin (同人; /dóRniN; doRniN ~ doRʑiN/ 'the said person; the same person → a like-minded person'), etc.
- dō fujin (同夫人; /dóR | ɸɯʑiN ~ dóR-ɸɯʑiN/ 'the said lady'), etc.

=== The honorific prefixes spelt with 御 ===
==== O‑ ====
===== O‑ + noun =====
Bimoraic compounds prefixed by the native o‑ tend to be unaccented: oko (御子; /ó-ko ~ o-ko/ 'your esteemed child'), ocha (御茶; /o-cɕa/ 'tea, politely speaking'), oha (御葉; /o-ha/ 'vegetables, politely and femininely speaking'), osu (御酢; /o-sɯ ~ o-sɯ́/ 'vinegar, politely and femininely speaking'), ome (御目; /o-me/ 'an eye, politely and femininely speaking'), oyu (御湯; /o-jɯ/ 'hot water, politely speaking'), etc.

Trimorae correlate with their prefixed component and tend to be:

- Unaccented if the component is originally unaccented: kane → okane (金→御金; /kane → o-kane/ 'money'), sake → osake (酒→御酒; /sake → o-sake/), sato → osato (里→御里; /sato → o-sato/ 'the hometown → your hometown'), niwa → oniwa (庭→御庭; /niwa → o-niwa/ 'a garden'), miya → miya (宮→御宮; /mija → o-mija/ 'a Shinto shrine'), yome → oyome (嫁→御嫁; /jome → o-jome/ 'a bride'), kyaku → okyaku (客→御客; /kjakɯ → o-kjakɯ/ 'a customer'), zen → ozen (膳→御膳; /zeN → o-zeN/ 'a small Japanese dining table'), etc.
- Unaccented or sometimes accented on the component's first mora if the component is originally final-accented:
  - imo → oimo (芋→御芋; /imó → o-imo/ 'a potato'), kura → okura (蔵→御蔵; /kɯɾá → o-kɯɾa/ 'a warehouse → a government warehouse'), kome → okome (米→御米; /komé → o-kome/ 'rice'), tera → otera (寺→御寺; /teɾá ~ teɾa → o-teɾa/ 'a Buddhist temple'), toshi → otoshi (年→御年; /toɕí → o-toɕi/ 'a year'), haka → ohaka (墓→御墓; /haká → o-haka/ 'a grave'), hana → ohana (花→御花; /haná → o-hana/ 'a flower'), heya → oheya (部屋→御部屋; /hejá → o-heja/ 'a room'), mimi → omimi (耳→御耳; /mimí → o-mimi/ 'an ear'), yama → oyama (山→御山; /jamá → o-jama/ 'a mountain → a holy mountain'), etc.
  - kami → okami (髪・紙→御髪・御紙; /kamí → o-kámi/ 'hair; paper'), kona → okona (粉→御粉; /koná → o-kóna/ 'powder'), sushi → osushi (鮨→御鮨; /sɯɕí ~ sɯ̥ɕí ~ sɯ́ɕi → o-sɯ́ɕi/), hiru → ohiru (昼→御昼; /hiɾɯ́ → o-híɾɯ/ 'daytime'), niku → oniku (肉→御肉; /nikɯ́ → o-níkɯ ~ o-nikɯ/ 'meat → northern groundcone'), kega → okega (怪我→御怪我; /keɡá → o-kéɡa/ 'an injury'), etc.
- Accented on the component's first mora or sometimes unaccented if the component is originally initial-accented:
  - kasa → okasa (傘→御傘; /kása → o-kása/ 'an umbrella'), kami → okami (上→御上; /kámi → o-kámi/ 'upper → Their Majesty/Highness ~ the authorities ~ the proprietress'), koto → okoto (琴→御琴; /kóto → o-kóto/), tsuyu → otsuyu (汁→御汁; /tsɯ́jɯ → o-tsɯ́jɯ/ 'soup'), hashi → ohashi (箸→御箸; /háɕi → o-háɕi/ 'a chopstick'), miso → omiso (味噌→御味噌; /míso → o-míso/), kashi → okashi (菓子→御菓子; /káɕi → o-káɕi/ 'candy'), etc.
  - kage → okage (蔭→御蔭; /káɡe → o-kaɡe/ 'shelter → divine protection'), koe → okoe (声→御声; /kóe → o-koe/ 'voice'), saru → osaru (猿→御猿; /sáɾɯ → o-saɾɯ/ 'a monkey'), naka → onaka (中→御腹; /náka → o-naka/ 'the middle → a belly'), yado → oyado (宿→御宿; /jádo → o-jado/ 'lodging'), fune → ofune (船→御船; /ɸɯ́ne → o-ɸɯne/ 'a watercraft'), etc.
  - nabe → onabe (鍋→御鍋; /nábe → o-nábe ~ o-nabe/ 'a cooking pot'), hari → ohari (針→御針; /háɾi → o-haɾi ~ o-háɾi/ 'a needle → needlework'), etc.

Long-compound quadrimorae tend to be:

- Regularly accented on the component's first mora if it is originally unaccented or initial-accented:
  - karada → okarada (体→御体; /kaɾada → o-káɾada/ 'a body'), kimono → okimono (着物→御着物; /kimono → o-kímono/), kuruma → okuruma (車→御車; /kɯɾɯma → o-kɯ́ɾɯma/ 'a car'), sakaki → osakaki (榊→御榊; /sakaki → o-sákaki/ 'Cleyera japonica'), shigoto → oshigoto (仕事→御仕事; /ɕiɡoto → o-ɕíɡoto/ 'work'), senaka → osenaka (背中→御背中; /senaka → o-sénaka/ 'a back'), tegami → otegami (手紙→御手紙; /teɡami → o-téɡami/ 'a mail letter'), haori → ohaori (羽織→御羽織; /haoɾi → o-háoɾi/), hagaki → ohagaki (葉書→御葉書; /haɡaki → o-háɡaki/ 'a postcard'), bōshi → obōshi (帽子→御帽子; /boRɕi → o-bóRɕi/ 'a hat'), etc.
  - inochi → oinochi (命→御命; /ínocɕi → o-ínocɕi/ 'a life'), kaiko → okaiko (蚕→御蚕; /káiko → o-káiko/ 'a silkworm'), kagura → okagura (神楽→御神楽; /káɡɯɾa → o-káɡɯɾa/), sugata → osugata (姿→御姿; /sɯ́ɡata → o-sɯ́ɡata/ 'a shape'), namida → onamida (涙→御涙; /námida → o-námida/ 'tears'), sanji → osanji (三時→御三時; /sáNʑi → o-sáNʑi/ 'an afternoon snack'), tenki → otenki (天気→御天気; /téNki → o-téNki/ 'the weather'), etc.
  - But some old ones are unaccented:
    - sakana → osakana (魚→御魚; /sakana → o-sakana/ 'a fish'), shūto → oshūto (姑→御姑; /ɕɯRto → o-ɕɯRto/ 'a mother-in-law'), dango → odango (団子→御団子; /daNɡo → o-daNɡo/), shinko → oshinko (新香→御新香; /ɕiNko → o-ɕiNko/ 'fresh pickles'), etc.
    - ikutsu → oikutsu (幾つ→御幾つ; /íkɯ̥tsɯ → o-ikɯ̥tsɯ/ 'how many things'), etc.
- Irregularly unaccented if the component is originally final- or medial-accented:
  - kagami → okagami (鏡→御鏡; /kaɡamí → o-kaɡami/ 'a mirror → a mirror mochi'), kotoba → okotoba (言葉→御言葉; /kotobá → o-kotoba/ 'a word'), takara → otakara (宝→御宝; /takaɾá → o-takaɾa/ 'treasure'), chikara → ochikara (力→御力; /cɕi̥kaɾá → o-cɕi̥kaɾa/ 'strength'), noroke → onoroke (惚気→御惚気; /noɾoké ~ noɾoke → o-noɾoke/ 'bragging about one's love life'), hakama → ohakama (袴→御袴; /hakamá ~ hakáma → o-hakama/), hanami → ohanami (花見→御花見; /hanamí → o-hanami/), fukuro → ofukuro (袋→御袋; /ɸɯ̥kɯɾó → o-ɸɯ̥kɯɾo/ 'a bag → one's mother'), medama → omedama (目玉→御目玉; /medamá → o-médama ~ o-medama/ 'an eyeball → a dressing-down'), zashiki → ozashiki (座敷→御座敷; /zaɕi̥kí → o-zaɕi̥ki/ 'a tatami drawing room'), sekku → osekku (節句→御節句; /seQkɯ ~ seQkɯ́ → o-seQkɯ/ 'a seasonal festival'), etc.
  - kokoro → okokoro (心→御心; /kokóɾo ~ kokoɾó → o-kokoɾo/ 'a heart'), tehon → otehon (手本→御手本; /tehóN → o-tehoN/ 'an exemplar model'), satō → osatō (砂糖→御砂糖; /satóR → o-satoR/ 'sugar'), etc.
  - But: shiken → oshiken (試験→御試験; /ɕi̥kéN → o-ɕi̥kéN/ 'an exam'), fukin → ofukin (布巾→御布巾; /ɸɯ̥kíN → o-ɸɯ̥kíN/ 'a dishcloth'), etc.

Quinquemorae tend to be:

- Irregularly unaccented, or sometimes regularly accented on the component's first mora, if the component is originally unaccented:
  - kanmuri → okanmuri (冠→御冠; /kaNmɯɾi ~ kaNmɯ́ɾi → o-kaNmɯɾi/ 'a crown → a bad mood'), toshidama → otoshidama (年玉→御年玉; /toɕidama → o-toɕidama/), tomodachi → otomodachi (友達→御友達; /tomodacɕi → o-tomodacɕi/ 'a friend'), hakimono → ohakimono (履き物→御履き物; /hakimono → o-hakimono/ 'footwear'), sōshiki → osōshiki (葬式→御葬式; /soRɕi̥ki → o-soRɕi̥ki/ 'a funeral'), chūgen → ochūgen (中元→御中元; /cɕɯRɡeN → o-cɕɯRɡeN/ 'the Ghost Festival → a gift during the Ghost Festival'), ningyō → oningyō (人形→御人形; /niNɡjoR → o-niNɡjoR/ 'a doll'), dōraku → odōraku (道楽→御道楽; /doRɾakɯ́ ~ doRɾákɯ ~ dohɾakɯ → o-doRɾakɯ́ ~ o-doRɾakɯ/ 'a hobby'), etc.
  - donburi → odonburi (丼→御丼; /doNbɯɾi → o-dóNbɯɾi/), tenugui → otenugui (手拭い→御手拭い; /tenɯɡɯi → o-ténɯɡɯi/ 'a hand towel'), sentaku → osentaku (洗濯→御洗濯; /sentakɯ → o-séNtakɯ/ 'laundry'), etc.
- Regularly accented if the component is originally initial- or medial-accented:
  - kozukai → okozukai (小遣い→御小遣い; /kózɯkai → o-kózɯkai/ 'pocket money'), daijin → odaijin (大尽→御大尽; /dáiʑiN → o-dáiʑiN/ 'a magnate'), tōban → otōban (当番→御当番; /tóRbaN → o-tóRbaN/ 'being on duty'), etc.
  - tearai → otearai (手洗い→御手洗い; /teáɾai → o-teáɾai/ 'hand washing → a restroom'), jōhin → ojōhin (上品→御上品; /ʑoRhíN → o-ʑoRhíN/ 'sophistication'), sōzai → osōzai (総菜→御総菜; /soRzai ~ soRzái → o-soRzái/ 'an everyday side dish'), hizaokuri → ohizaokuri (膝送り→御膝送り; /hizaókɯɾi → o-hizaókɯɾi ~ o-hizaokɯɾi/ 'moving to make more seating room'), etc.

Contractions with o‑ tend to be accented on the prefixed component's first mora: {tamago; otamajakushi} → otama ({卵・御玉杓子}→御玉; /{tamáɡo ~ tamaɡo; o-tamaʑákɯ̥ɕi} → o-táma/ '{an egg; a ladle → a tadpole}'), unagi → ouna (鰻→おうな; /ɯnaɡi → o-ɯ́na/ 'an eel'), sagegami → osagegami → osage (下げ髪→御下げ髪→御下げ; /saɡéɡami → o-saɡéɡami → o-sáɡe/ 'a Japanese-style girls' braid'), bakemono → obake (化け物→御化け; /bakemóno ~ bakemonó → o-báke/ 'a monster'), suberidai → osuberi (滑り台→御滑り; /sɯbeɾídai → o-sɯ́beɾi/ 'a playground slide'), jūbako → ojū (重箱→御重; /ʑɯRbako → o-ʑɯ́R/), senbei → osen (煎餅→御煎; /séNbei → o-séN/), dengaku → oden (田楽→御田; /deNɡakɯ ~ déNɡakɯ → o-déN/), Satsumaimo → osatsu (薩摩芋→御薩; /satsɯmaimo → o-sátsɯ/ 'a sweet potato'), kotatsu → okota (炬燵→おこた; /kotatsɯ → o-kóta/), etc.

Feminine names and expressions of quantity and time tend to keep their accent even when prefixed by o‑:

- Sato → Osato (里→お里): /sáto → o-sáto/ (compare 'the hometown → your hometown': /sato → o-sato/)
- Hana → Ohana (花→お花): /hána → o-hána/ (compare 'a flower': /haná → o-hana/)
- Miya → Omiya (宮→お宮): /míja → o-míja/ (compare 'a Shinto shrine': /mija → o-mija/)
- tsuru → Tsuru → Otsuru (鶴→お鶴; 'a crane → Tsuru → Otsuru'): /tsɯ́ɾɯ → o-tsɯ́ɾɯ/
- kichi → Kichi → Okichi (吉→お吉; 'good luck → Kichi → Okichi'): /{kí̥cɕi → ki̥cɕí} → {o-kí̥cɕi → o-ki̥cɕí}/
- fuku → Fuku → Ofuku (福→お福; 'good fortune → Fuku → Ofuku'): /ɸɯ̥kɯ́ → o-ɸɯ̥kɯ́/
- hitori → ohitori (一人→御一人; 'one person'): /hi̥tóɾi → o-hi̥tóɾi/
- futari → ofutari (二人→御二人; 'two people'): /ɸɯ̥taɾí → o-ɸɯ̥taɾí/
- mittsu → omittsu (三つ→御三つ; 'three things'): /miQtsɯ́ → o-miQtsɯ́/
- shōgatsu → oshōgatsu (正月→御正月; 'January'): /ɕoRɡatsɯ́ → o-ɕoRɡatsɯ́/

===== O‑ + verbal infinitive =====
Verbal-infinitive-derived compounds tend to be unaccented:

- tonari → otonari (隣り→隣→御隣; 'being adjacent → one's neighbor'): /tonaɾi → o-tonaɾi/
- matsuri → omatsuri (祭り→御祭り; 'worshipping → a festival'): /matsɯɾi → o-matsɯɾi/
- mukae → omukae (迎え→御迎え; 'meeting'): /mɯkae → o-mɯkae/
- tōshi → otōshi (通し→御通し; 'letting through → an appetizer with sake'): /tóRɕi → toRɕí → o-toRɕi/
- hanashi → ohanashi (話し→話→御話; 'talking → talk'): /hanáɕi → hanaɕí → o-hanaɕi/
- yasumi → oyasumi (休み→御休み; 'resting → a day off'): /jasɯ́mi → jasɯmí → o-jasɯmi/
- yorokobi → oyorokobi (喜び→御喜び; 'rejoicing → joy → a joyous occasion'): /joɾokóbi → joɾokobi ~ joɾokóbi ~ joɾokobí → o-joɾokobi/
- wakare → owakare (別れ→御別れ; 'parting'): /wakáɾe → wakaɾé → o-wakaɾe/
- But:
  - kawari → okawari (代わり→御代わり; 'replacing → a replacement → a second serving'): /kawaɾi → o-káwaɾi/
  - nobori → onobori → onoborisan (上り→御上り→御上りさん; 'ascending → an ascent → a bumpkin coming to the city'): /noboɾi → o-nóboɾi → o-nóboɾi-saN/
  - mawari → omawari → omawarisan (回り→御巡り→御巡りさん; 'circling → a patrol officer'): /mawaɾi → o-máwari → o-máwari-saN/
  - musubi → omusubi (結び→御結び; 'knotting → a knot → an omusubi'): /mɯsɯbi → o-mɯ́sɯbi/
  - yuzuri → oyuzuri (譲り→御譲り; 'bequeathing → inheritance'): /jɯzɯɾi → o-jɯ́zɯɾi/
  - shaberi → oshaberi (喋り→御喋り; 'chatting → chit-chat'): /ɕabéɾi → ɕabeɾí → o-ɕábeɾi/
  - hiraki → ohiraki (開き→御開き; 'opening → the closure of an event'): (Note: A superstitious euphemism to avoid literally saying "closure".) /hiɾáki → hiɾakí → o-híɾaki ~ o-hiɾaki/
  - sagari → osagari (下がり→御下がり; 'coming down → leftovers ~ a hand-me-down'): /saɡáɾi → saɡaɾí → o-sáɡaɾi/

Exaltative and polite o‑ verbal-infintive-based constructions are unaccented, regardless of the infinitives' original accent, when combining with the verbs suru (する・致す; /sɯɾɯ; itásɯ/ 'I do some …‑ing, politely speaking ~ I do some …‑ing to/for/with your/their esteemed self'), nasaru; ni naru (為さる・に為る; /nasáɾɯ; ni náɾɯ/ 'your/their esteemed self does some …‑ing'), etc, and only the "doing" verb at the end determines the accentual outcome:

- yobi → oyobi suru (呼び→お呼びする; 'calling → I call their esteemed self'): /jobi → o-jobi sɯɾɯ/
- yomi → oyomi suru (読み→お読みする; 'reading → I read it, politely speaking'): /jómi → o-jomi sɯɾɯ/
- negai → onegai shimasu (願い→お願いします; 'requesting → I request it, politely speaking'): /neɡái → o-neɡai ɕimásɯ/
- machi → omachi itashimasu (待ち→お願いいたします; 'awaiting → I await your esteemed self'): /mácɕi → o-macɕi itaɕimásɯ/
- narai → Sensei kara piano o onarai itashitai n desu (習い→先生からピアノをお習いいたしたいんです; 'learning → I'd like to learn the piano from you, Teacher'): /naɾái → seNséi kaɾa piano o | o-naɾai itaɕi̥tái n desɯ/
- naki → onaki nasaru (泣き→お泣きなさる; 'crying → their esteemed self cries'): /naki → o-naki násaɾɯ/
- yasumi → oyasumi nasai (休み→お休みなさい; 'resting → your esteemed self, please rest → good night'): /jasɯ́mi → o-jasɯmi nasái/
- kaeri → okaeri nasai (帰り→お帰りなさい; 'going home → your esteemed self, please come home → welcome home'): /káeɾi → o-kaeɾi nasái/
- kasane → okasane ni naru (重ね→お重ねになる; 'piling up → their esteemed self piles them up'): /kasane → o-kasane ni náɾɯ/
- anji → oanji ni naru (案じ→お案じになる; 'thinking up → their esteemed self thinks it up'): /aNʑi ~ áNʑi → o-aNʑi ni náɾɯ/
- hanashi → ohanashi (ni natte) kudasai (話し→お話し(になって)ください; 'talking → your esteemed self, please do me a favor and talk'): /hanáɕi → o-hanaɕi (ni náQte |) kɯdasái/

===== O‑ + adjective/adjectival noun =====
Compounds formed with adjectives and adjectival nouns tend to be unaccented:

- atsuatsu → oatsuatsu (熱々→御熱々; 'piping hot'): /atsɯatsɯ → o-atsɯatsɯ/
- atsui → oatsui (熱い→御熱い; 'is hot'): /atsɯ́i → o-atsɯi/
- nemui → onemui (眠い→御眠い; 'is sleepy'): /nemɯi ~ nemɯ́i → o-nemɯi/
- chīsai → ochīsai (小さい→御小さい; 'is small'): /cɕiRsái → o-cɕiRsai/
- medetai → omedetai (目出度い→御目出度い; 'is asupicious'): /medetai ~ medetái → o-medetai/
- takaku → otakaku (高く→御高く; 'is high'): /tákakɯ ~ takákɯ → o-takakɯ/
- utsukushī → outsukushī (美しい→御美しい; 'is beautiful'): /ɯtsɯ̥kɯɕíR → o-ɯtsɯ̥kɯɕiR/
- yoroshī → oyoroshī (宜しい→御宜しい; 'is good'): /joɾoɕíR ~ joɾoɕiR → o-joɾoɕiR/
- yoroshiku → oyoroshiku (宜しく→御宜しく; 'being good'): /joɾóɕi̥kɯ ~ joɾoɕí̥kɯ ~ joɾoɕi̥kɯ → o-joɾoɕi̥kɯ/
- yasashī → oyasashī (優しい→御優しい; 'is simple'): /jasaɕiR → o-jasaɕiR/
- yasashū → oyasashū (優しゅう→御優しゅう; 'being simple'): /jasaɕɯR → o-jasaɕɯR/
- yakamashū → oyakamashū (喧しゅう→御喧しゅう; 'being noisy'): /jakamáɕɯR ~ jakamaɕɯ́R → o-jakamaɕɯR/
- shizuka → oshizuka (静か→御静か; 'quiet'): /ɕízɯka → o-ɕizɯka/
- nigiyaka → onigiyaka (賑やか→御賑やか; 'lively'): /niɡíjaka → o niɡijaka ~ o-niɡíjaka/

==== On‑ ====
On‑ (/óN/) tends to form initial-accented or non-compoundified compounds.

- mi → onmi (身→御身; 'a body → your esteemed body → you'): /mi → óN-mi/
- te → onte (手→御手; 'a hand → your esteemed hand'): /té → óN-te/
- chi → onchi (地→御地; 'the ground → your esteemed place'): /cɕí → óN-cɕi/
- mae → onmae (前→御前; 'the front → your esteemed presence'): /máe → óN-mae/
- take → Ontake (嶽→御嶽; 'a peak → Ontake'): /také → óN-take/
- toshi → ontoshi (年→御年; 'age → your esteemed age'): /toɕí → óN-toɕi/
- mizukara → on mizukara (自ら→御自ら; 'self → your esteemed self'): /mízɯkaɾa → óN-mizɯkaɾa ~ óN | mízɯkaɾa/
- taishō → on taishō (大将→御大将; 'a general → you, the esteemed general'): /táiɕoR → óN | táiɕoR/
- obiji → on obiji (帯地→御帯地; 'obi cloth → your esteemed obi cloth'): /obiʑi → óN | obiʑi/
- But: zōshi → onzōshi (曹司→御曹司; 'a noble's son's room → a noble's son'): /zóRɕi → oN-zóRɕi/

==== Mi‑ ====
Mi‑ tends to form unaccented compounds.

- na → mina (名→御名; /na → mi-na/ 'a name → Your/Their name'), yuki → miyuki (行き→行幸; /jɯki → mi-jɯki/ 'going outside → Your/Their Majesty's visit'), te → mite (手→御手; /té → mi-te/ 'a hand → Your/Their hand'), tera → mitera (寺→御寺; /teɾá ~ teɾa → mi-teɾa/ 'a Buddhist temple → Your/Their temple'), kado → mikado (門→御門→帝; /kádo → mi-kado/ 'a gate → Your/Their Majesty's gate → Your/Their Majesty the Emperor'), koe → mikoe (声→御声; /kóe → mi-koe/ 'voice → Your/Their voice'), tama → mitama (霊→御霊; /táma → mi-tama/ 'a soul → their departed soul'), mae → mimae (前→御前; /máe → mi-mae/ 'the front → Your/Their presence'), etc.
- akashi → miakashi (明かし→御灯明; /akaɕi → mi-akaɕi ~ mi-ákaɕi/ 'a light → a consecrated light'), hotoke → mihotoke (仏→御仏; /hotoke ~ hotoké → mi-hotoke/ 'a buddha → a Buddha'), kokoro → mikokoro (心→御心; /kokóɾo ~ kokoɾó → mi-kokoɾo/ 'a heart → Your/Their heart'), etc.
- But:
  - sugata → misugata (姿→御姿; /sɯ́ɡata → mi-sɯ́ɡata/ 'a figure → Your/Their figure'), yashiro → Miyashiro (社→御社; /jáɕiɾo → mi-jáɕiɾo/ 'a Shinto shrine → Miyashiro'), etc.
  - ashi → omiashi (足→御御足; /aɕí → o-mi-aɕi ~ o-mí-aɕi/ 'a foot → Your/Their august foot')
  - akashi → omiakashi (明かし→御御灯火; /akaɕi → o-mi-ákaɕi/ 'a light → an augustly consecrated light')
  - tsuke → otsuke → omiotsuke (付け→御汁→御味御汁; /tsɯ̥́ke → tsɯ̥ké → o-tsɯ̥ke → o-mi-ó-tsɯ̥ke/ 'applying → miso soup, politely and femininely speaking → miso soup → miso soup, politely speaking')
  - ōkī → omiōkī (大きい→御御大きい; /oRkíR → o-mi-oRkíR ~ o-mi-oRkiR/ 'is large → is large, with all due respect')

==== Go‑ ====
Go‑ tends to have no effect on the nouns that it prefixes:

- on → goon (恩→御恩; /óN → ɡo-óN/ 'a favor → your/their favor'), buji → gobuji (無事→御無事; /bɯʑi → ɡo-bɯʑi/ 'safety → your/their safety'), etc.
- kigen → gokigen (機嫌→御機嫌; /kiɡeN → ɡo-kiɡeN/ 'spirits → your/their spirits'), fujin → gofujin (婦人→御婦人; /ɸɯʑiN → ɡo-ɸɯʑiN/ 'a lady → the esteemed lady'), Butsuzen → gobutsuzen (仏前→御仏前; /bɯtsɯzeN → ɡo-bɯtsɯzeN/ 'the Buddha's spiritual presence → the Buddha's augustly spiritual presence'), anshin → goanshin (安心→御安心; /aNɕiN → ɡo-aNɕiN/ 'peace of mind → your/their peace of mind'), jōdan → gojōdan (冗談→御冗談; /ʑoRdáN → ɡo-ʑoRdáN/ 'your/their joke'), kurō → gokurō (苦労→御苦労; /kɯ́ɾoR → ɡo-kɯ́ɾoR/ 'trouble → your/their trouble'), ryōshin → goryōshin (両親→御両親; /ɾjóRɕiN → ɡo-ɾjóRɕiN/ 'both parents → your/their both parents'), etc.
- busata → gobusata (無沙汰→御無沙汰; /bɯsata → ɡo-bɯsata/ 'my neglect to contact you/them'), etc.
- zonji → gozonji (存じ→御存知; /zoNʑi ~ zóNʑi → ɡo-zóNʑi/ 'being aware of → awareness → your/their awareness'), motto mo → go-motto mo (尤も→御尤も; /moQtó mo ~ móQto mo → ɡo-móQto mo/ 'reasonable → you/them being reasonable'), etc.

==== Gyo‑ ====
Gyo‑ can only form short compounds with Sino-Japanese morphemes. Bimorae with it tend to be initial-accented, and trimorae tend to be unaccented:

- gyou (御宇; /ɡjóɯ/ 'Your/Their Majesty's reign'), gyoji (御璽; /ɡjóʑi/ 'Your/Their Majesty's seal')
- gyoen (御苑; /ɡjoeN ~ ɡjóeN/ 'Your/Their Majesty's garden'), gyokan (御感; /ɡjokaN/ 'Your/Their Majesty's approval'), gyosei (御製; /ɡjosei ~ ɡjósei/ 'Your/Their Majesty's composition'), gyotai (御体; /ɡjotai/ 'Your/Their Majesty's body'), gyodai (御題; /ɡjodai/ 'Your/Their Majesty's theme for the New Year's poetry competition'), etc.

== Suffixes ==
=== ‑chū, ‑jū, ‑go, ‑zen, ‑mae and ‑zumi ===
‑chū (中; /cɕɯ́R/ 'in the middle of'), chū → ‑jū (中; 'throughout'), ‑go (後; /ɡo/ 'after'), ‑zen ~ ‑mae (前; /zéN ~ máe/ 'before') and sumi → ‑zumi (済み; /sɯ́mi → sɯmí/ 'being over/settled') are productively and regularly dominant after nouns (but not necessarily as short compounds' components, for example in sengo (戦後; /seNɡo ~ séNɡo/ 'after the war'), senzen (戦前; /seNzeN/ 'before the war') etc; and some idiomatic expressions such as Edomae (江戸前; /edo-mae/ 'Edo waters → Edo seafood')), as follows:

- ‑chū, ‑jū and ‑zumi are deaccenting:
  - kongetsuchū (今月中; /koNɡetsɯ̥-cɕɯR/ 'during this month'), junbichū (準備中; /ʑɯNbi-cɕɯR/ 'during preparation'), kūkichū (空気中; /kɯRki̥-cɕɯR/ 'in mid-air'), etc.
  - hitobanjū (一晩中; /hi̥tobaN-ʑɯR/ 'all night long'), sekaijū (世界中; /sekai-ʑɯR/ 'the world over'), karadajū (体中; /kaɾada-ʑɯR/ 'all over the body'), etc.
  - shikenzumi (試験済み; /ɕi̥keN-zɯmi/ 'the exam is over with'), chūmonzumi (注文済み; /cɕɯRmoN-zɯmi/ 'ordering is over with'), etc.
- ‑go is initial-accented or deaccenting: sensōgo (戦争後; /seNsoR-ɡó ~ seNsoR-ɡo/ 'after the war'), kenchikugo (建築後; /keNcɕi̥kɯ-ɡó ~ keNcɕi̥kɯ-ɡo/ 'after construction'), etc.
- ‑zen and ‑mae are initial-accented: sensōzen ~ sensōmae (戦争前; /seNsoR-zéN ~ seNsoR-máe/ 'before the war'), kenchikuzen ~ kenchikumae (建築前; /keNcɕi̥kɯ-zéN ~ keNcɕi̥kɯ-máe/ 'before construction'), etc.

=== ‑sama, ‑chama, ‑san, ‑chan, ‑don, ‑ya and ‑ki ===
‑sama (様; /samá/ 'appearance') and its derivatives ‑chama, ‑san and ‑chan, as well as ‑don (derived from ‑dono below), ‑ya and ‑ki (貴; derived from kimi (君; 'Lord/Lady')), are recessive and unaccented, always so after proper nouns and mostly so after common nouns. Adding the prefix o‑ (御) in these cases does not make a difference:

- Ono (小野; /ono-sama → ono-saN/), Hara (原; /háɾa-sama → háɾa-saN/), Hara Toshiaki (原敏明; /háɾa | toɕíaki̥-saN ~ háɾa toɕiaki̥-saN/), Nakamura (中村; /nakamɯɾa-sama → nakamɯɾa-saN/), Yamashita (山下; /jamáɕi̥ta-sama → jamáɕi̥ta-saN/), Katō (加藤; /kátoR-sama → kátoR-saN/), Andō (安藤; /áNdoR-sama → áNdoR-saN/), etc.
- Yuki (雪; /jɯ́ki̥-saN, jɯ́ki̥-cɕaN/), Masao (正男; /masao-saN, masao-cɕaN/), Akiko (明子; /áki̥ko-saN, áki̥ko-cɕaN/), Shōichi (正一; /ɕoRicɕi̥-saN, ɕoRicɕi̥-cɕaN ~ ɕoRicɕí̥-cɕaN ~ ɕoRícɕi̥-cɕaN/), Kazuhiko (和彦; /kazɯ́hi̥ko-saN, kazɯ́hi̥ko-cɕaN/), Daisuke (大助; /dáisɯ̥ke-saN, dáisɯ̥ke-cɕaN/), Oisesan (お伊勢さん; /o-íse-saN/ 'the Ise Shrine'), etc.
- kaka (母・嬶; /káka-sama → kakáR-sama → (o-)káR-sama → (o-)káR-saN, (o-)káR-cɕaN/ 'a mom'), toto (父; /tóto-sama → {(o-)tóR-sama → (o-)tóR-saN, (o-)tóRcɕaN}, toQtsáN, toQcɕáN ~ tóQcɕaN/ 'a dad'), baba (婆; /bába-sama → babáR-sama → (o-)báR-sama → (o-)báR-saN, (o-)báR-cɕaN/ 'a grandma'), jiji (爺; /ʑíʑi-sama → ʑiʑíR-sama → (o-)ʑíR-sama → (o-)ʑíR-saN, (o-)ʑíR-cɕaN/ 'a grandpa'), jō (嬢; /(o-)ʑóR-sama → (o-)ʑóR-saN, (o-)ʑóR-cɕaN/ 'a young mistress'), hime (姫; /(o-)híme-sama/ 'a princess'), oko (御子; /oko-sama → oko-saN/ 'your child'), oku (奥; /ókɯ̥-sama → ókɯ̥-saN/ 'the lady of the house'), yaoya (八百屋; /jaoja-saN/ 'a greengrocer'), hanaya (花屋; /hanája-saN/ 'a florist'), etc.
- oba (小母; /oba-sama → oba-saN, oba-cɕaN; oba-ki/ 'an aunt'), oji (小父; /oʑi-sama → {oʑi-saN → oQsaN → oQtsaN}, oʑi-cɕaN; oʑi-ki/ 'an uncle'), ane (姉; /ane-sama → anéR-sama → (o-)néR-sama → (o-)néR-saN, (o-)néR-cɕaN; ane-ki/ 'an elder sister'), ani (兄; /áni-sama → áN-cɕaN, {aníR-sama → (o-)níR-sama → (o-)níR-san, (o-)níR-cɕaN}; áni-ki/ 'an elder brother'), etc.
- Take (竹; /táke-doN, táke-ja/), bō(ya) (坊(や); /bóR(-ja)/ 'a little boy'), bāya (婆や; /báR-ja ~ baR-já/ 'the dear old maidservant/wet nurse'), jīya (爺や; /ʑíR-ja ~ ʑiR-já/ 'the dear old manservant'), nēya (姉や; /néR-ja/ 'the dear young maidservant/nursemaid'), etc.

‑sama sometimes exert its original final accent, or becomes a regular long-compound head, in some common-noun compounds:

- okyaku → okyakusama → okyakusan (御客→御客様→御客さん; 'the guest'): /okjakɯ → okjakɯ̥-samá ~ okjakɯ̥-sáma ~ {okjakɯ̥-sama → okjakɯ̥-saN}/
- Hotoke → Hotokesama (仏→仏様; 'the Buddha'): /hotoke ~ hotoké → hotoke-samá ~ hotoke-sáma/

‑samasama is final-accented and can form its own minor phrase:

- kaisha → kaisha samasama da (会社→会社様々だ; 'a company → it's good to have this company'): /kaiɕa → kaiɕa samasamá da/
- otenki → otenki samasama da (御天気→御天気様々だ; 'the weather → it's good to have this weather'): /otéNki → otéNki | samasamá da/

=== ‑dono ===
Tono → ‑dono (殿; /tóno/ 'your/their, an esteemed person's, mansion → you/they/them, an esteemed person → Mr(s)/M(is)s') is recessive, and unaccented or initial-accented:

- Yamada → Yamadadono (山田→山田殿; /jamada → jamada-dono ~ jamada-dóno/), Masao → Masaodono (正雄→正雄殿; /masao → masao-dono ~ masao-dóno/), etc.
- Yamashita → Yamashitadono (山下→山下殿; /jamáɕi̥ta → jamáɕi̥ta-dono/), Kazuhiko → Kazuhikodono (和彦→和彦殿; /kazɯ́hi̥ko → kazɯ́hi̥ko-dono/), etc.
- Katō → Katōdono (加藤→加藤殿; /kátoR → kátoR-dono/), Hanako → Hanakodono (花子→花子殿; /hánako → hánako-dono/), etc.

=== ‑shi and ‑uji ===
‑shi (氏; /ɕí/ 'Mr ~ Lord') is recessive and preaccenting, and alternatively forms it own downstepped minor phrase after an accented name:

- Ono → Onoshi (小野→小野氏; /ono → onó-ɕi/), Nakamura → Nakamurashi (中村→中村氏; /nakamɯɾa → nakamɯɾá-ɕi/), Masao → Masaoshi (正雄→正雄氏; /masao → masaó-ɕi/), etc.
- Hara → Harashi (原→原氏; /háɾa → háɾa-ɕi ~ háɾa | ɕí/), Tokugawa → Tokugawashi (徳川→徳川氏; /tokɯ́ɡawa ~ tokɯɡawa → tokɯ́ɡawa-ɕi ~ tokɯ́ɡawa | ɕí ~ tokɯɡawá-ɕi/ 'Tokugawa → Lord Tokugawa'), etc.
- Katō → Katōshi (加藤→加藤氏; /kátoR → kátoR-ɕi ~ kátoR | ɕí/), Andō → Andōshi (安藤→安藤氏; /áNdoR → áNdoR-ɕi ~ áNdoR | ɕí/), etc.

‑shi ('a clan') is dominant and preaccenting:

- Tokugawa → Tokugawashi (徳川→徳川氏; /tokɯ́ɡawa ~ tokɯɡawa → tokɯɡawá-ɕi/ 'Tokugawa → the Tokugawa clan'), Hōjō → Hōjōshi (北条→北条氏; /hoRʑoR → hoRʑóR-ɕi/ 'Hōjō → the Hōjō clan'), etc.
- Mōri → Mōrishi (毛利→毛利氏; /móRɾi → moRɾí-ɕi/ 'Mōri → the Mōri clan'), Ashikaga → Ashikagashi (足利→足利氏; /aɕi̥káɡa → aɕi̥kaɡá-ɕi/ 'Ashikaga → the Ashikaga clan'), etc.

‑uji (/ɯ́ʑi/ 'a clan') is recessive or dominant, and preaccenting:

- Tanaka → Tanakauji (田中→田中氏; /tanaka → tanaká-ɯʑi/), etc.
- Kuroda → Kurodauji (黒田→黒田氏; /kɯ́ɾoda → kɯɾodá-ɯʑi ~ kɯ́ɾoda-ɯʑi/), etc.

=== ‑ke ===
‑ke (家; 'a family') is typically dominant, and deaccenting or preaccenting, but is additionally recessive and not deaccenting after accented bimoraic names:

- Ono → Onoke (小野→小野家; /ono → ono-ke ~ onó-ke/), Yoshida → Yoshidake (吉田→吉田家; /joɕida → joɕida-ke ~ joɕidá-ke/), etc.
- Nishimura → Nishimurake (西村→西村家; /niɕímɯɾa → niɕimɯɾa-ke ~ niɕimɯɾá-ke/), etc.
- Satō → Satōke (佐藤→佐藤家; /sátoR → satoR-ke ~ satóR-ke/), Andō → Andōke (安藤→安藤家; /áNdoR → aNdoR-ke ~ aNdóR-ke/), etc.
  - But: Hara → Harake (原→原家; /háɾa → háɾa-ke ~ haɾá-ke/), etc.

=== ‑kun, ‑gimi and ‑ue ===
‑kun (君) is recessive and unaccented, or preaccenting only after unaccented family names:

- Masao → Masaokun (正男→正男君; /masao → masao-kɯN/), etc.
  - But: Yamada → Yamadakun (山田→山田君; /jamada → jamada-kɯN ~ jamadá-kɯN/), Nakamura → Nakamurakun (中村→中村君; /nakamɯɾa → nakamɯɾa-kɯN ~ nakamɯɾá-kɯN/), etc.
- Nakagawa → Nakagawakun (中川→中川氏; /nakáɡawa → nakáɡawa-kɯN/), Kazuhiko → Kazuhikokun (和彦→和彦君; /kazɯ́hi̥ko → kazɯ́hi̥ko-kɯN/), etc.
- Katō → Katōkun (加藤→加藤君; /kátoR → kátoR-kɯN/), Akira → Akirakun (明→明君; /ákiɾa → ákiɾa-kɯN/), etc.

Short Sino-Japanese compounds with ‑kun tend to be initial-accented: saikun (細君; /sáikɯN/ 'my wife → your/his wife'), yūkun (遊君; /jɯ́RkɯN/ 'a courtesan'), etc.

Kimi → ‑gimi (君; /kimi/ 'a noble → Lord/Lady') and ‑ue (上; /ɯe/ 'the top side') tend to be dominant and preaccenting:

- Tsuruchiyo → Tsuruchiyogimi (鶴千代君; /tsɯɾɯcɕijó-ɡimi/ 'Tsuruchiyo → Lord Tsuruchiyo'), yodo → Yodo → Yodogimi (淀→淀君; /jódo → jodó-ɡimi ~ jodo-ɡimi/ 'a pool → Yodo → Lady Yodo'), etc.
- ane → anegimi; aneue (姉→姉君・姉上; /ane → ané-ɡimi; ané-ɯe/ 'an elder sister → my elder sister'), ani → anigimi; aniue (兄→兄君・兄上; /áni → aní-ɡimi; aní-ɯe/ 'an elder brother → my elder brother'), haha → hahagimi; hahaue (母→母君・母上; /háha → hahá-ɡimi; hahá-ɯe/ 'a mother → my mother'), chichi → chichigimi; chichiue (父→父君・父上; /{cɕí̥cɕi → cɕi̥cɕí} → cɕi̥cɕí-ɡimi; cɕi̥cɕí-ue/ 'a father → my father'), hime → himegimi (姫→姫君; /híme → himé-ɡimi/ 'a noblewoman → my lady'), ama → amagimi (尼→尼君; /áma ~ ama → amá-ɡimi/ 'a nun → my lady, a nun'), waka → wakagimi (若→若君; /wáka → waká-ɡimi/ 'a young master → my young master'), tsuji → tsujigimi (辻→辻君; /tsɯʑi → tsɯʑi-ɡimi ~ tsɯʑí-ɡimi/ 'an intersection → a streetwalker'), etc.

=== ‑go ===
‑go (御; contracted from gozen (御前; /ɡozeN ~ ɡózeN/ 'Your/Their presence')) tends to be dominant, and deaccenting in trimoraic compounds but preaccenting in longer nouns:

- ane → anego (姉→姉御; /ane → ane-ɡo/ 'an elder sister → my/your/their elder sister'), ani → anigo (兄→兄御; /áni → ani-ɡo ~ aní-ɡo/ 'an elder brother → my/your/their elder brother'), haha → hahago (母→母御; /háha → haha-ɡo ~ hahá-ɡo/ 'a mother → my/your/their mother'), chichi → chichigo (父→父御; /cɕí̥cɕi → cɕi̥cɕí → cɕi̥cɕi-ɡo/ 'a father → my/your/their father'), etc.
- musume → musumego (娘→娘子; /mɯsɯmé → mɯsɯmé-ɡo/ 'a daughter → your/their daughter'), imōto → imōtogo (妹→妹御; /imoRtó → imoRtó-ɡo/ 'a younger sister → your/their younger sister'), otōto → otōtogo (弟→弟御; /otoRtó → otoRtó-ɡo ~ otoRto-ɡo/ 'a younger brother → your/their younger brother'), yome → yomego (嫁→嫁御; /jome → jome-ɡo ~ jomé-ɡo/ 'a daughter-in-law → your/their daughter-in-law'), hanayome → hanayomego (花嫁→花嫁御; /hanájome → hanajomé-ɡo/ 'a bride → your/their bride'), etc.

=== ‑kō ===
‑kō (公; /kóR/ 'an East Asian duke → a duke/ducal prince') is recessive and unaccented, or dominant and preaccenting:

- Mito → Mitokō (水戸→水戸公; /mito → mito-koR ~ mitó-koR/ 'Mito → the Prince of Mito'), etc.
- Shimazu → Shimazukō (島津→島津公; /ɕímazɯ → ɕímazɯ-koR ~ ɕimazɯ́-koR/ 'Shimazu → Prince Shimazu'), Konoe → Konoekō (近衛→近衛公; /kónoe ~ konóe → konoé-koR/ 'Konoe → Prince Konoe'), etc.

Short Sino-Japanese compounds with ‑kō tend to be initial-accented:

- rōkō (老公; /ɾóRkoR/ 'an elderly prince'), Gukō (愚公; /ɡɯ́koR/ 'the Foolish Old Man'), etc.
- Sugawara no Michizane → Kankō (菅原道真→菅公; /sɯɡawaɾa no (|) micɕízane → káNkoR/ 'Sugawara no Michizane → Prince Sugawara'), Kusunoki Masashige → Nankō (楠木正成→楠公; /kɯ̥sɯ́noki (|) masaɕiɡe → náNkoR/ 'Kusunoki Masashige → Prince Kusunoki'), etc.

-kō ('the little') is dominant and initial-accented: Kumakō Hachikō (熊公八公; /kɯma-kóR | hacɕi̥-kóR/ 'the Little Kuma and the Little Hachi → an average Joe'), etc.

=== ‑bō and ‑nbo(o) ===
‑bō (坊; /bóR/ 'an Buddhist monk's room → a monk') is dominant and preaccenting: Musashi → Musashibō (武蔵→武蔵坊; /mɯ́saɕi → mɯsaɕí-boR/), Hōkai → Hōkaibō (法界→法界坊; /hoRkai → hoRkái-boR/ 'Dharmadhatu → Hōkaibō'), etc.

‑bō ('a sonny') is dominant and initial-accented: yoshi → Yoshibō (良→良坊; /jóɕi̥ → joɕi-bóR/ 'is good → Yoshibō'), Shō → Shōbō (正→正坊; /ɕóR → ɕoR-bóR/), mie → miebō (見え→見え坊; /míe → mié → mie-bóR ~ mié-boR ~ mie-boR/ 'showing off → a show-off'), etc.

‑nbo(o) tends to be recessive and unaccented:

- sakura → sakuranbo(o) (桜→桜ん坊; /sakɯɾa → sakɯɾa-Nbo(R)/ 'a cherry blossom → a cherry'), tsurushi → tsurushinbo(o) (吊るし→吊るしん坊; /tsɯɾɯɕi → tsɯɾɯɕi-Nbo(R)/ 'dangling → off-the-rack clothes'), etc.
- kechi → kechinbo(o) (けち→けちん坊; /kécɕi → kécɕi-Nbo(R) ~ kecɕí-Nbo(R)/ 'miserliness → a miser'), etc.
  - But (words with no equivalent nouns are parenthesized): (shiwai) → shiwanbo(o) ((吝い)→吝ん坊; /(ɕiwái) → ɕiwa-NboR ~ ɕiwá-NboR ~ ɕíwa-Nbo(R)/ '(is miserly) → a miser'), (okori) → okorinbo(o) ((怒り)→怒りん坊; /(okóɾi) → okoɾí-Nbo(R)/ '(getting angry) → a hothead')

=== ‑ō ===
‑ō (王; /óR/ 'a king → an East Asian imperial prince') is dominant and initial-accented: Riaō (リア王; /ɾia-óR/ 'King Lear'), zushi → Zushiō (厨子→厨子王; /zɯ́ɕi → zɯɕi-óR/ 'a miniature shrine → Zushiō'), yasha → Yashaō (夜叉→夜叉王; /jáɕa → jaɕa-óR/ 'a yaksha → the Yaksha King'), gankutsu → Gankutsuō (巌窟→巌窟王; /ɡaNkɯ̥tsɯ → ɡaNkɯ̥tsɯ-óR/ 'a cave → The Count of Monte Cristo'), etc.

=== ‑ya ===
‑ya (屋; /já/ 'a house → a shop') tends to be dominant and preaccenting in trimoraic shop names: kagi → kagiya → Kagiya (鍵→鍵屋; /kaɡí → kaɡí-ja/ 'a key → a locksmith's shop → Kagiya (Note: A fireworks shop in Edo, now known as Souke Hanabi "Kagiya.")'), tama → tamaya → Tamaya (玉→玉屋; /tamá → tamá-ja/ 'a ball → a jewel → a jewelry shop → Tamaya (Note: A fireworks shop in Edo, spun off from Kagiya. Also a soap (シャボン玉, shabondama) dealer in Edo.)'), etc.

‑ya as used in some stage family names and derogatory terms is dominant and preaccenting as well:

- yanagi → Yanagiya (柳→柳家; /janaɡi → janaɡí-ja/ 'willow → Yanagiya (Note: A rakugo family.)'), suzu no → Suzunoya (鈴の→鈴屋; /sɯzɯ no → sɯzɯ-nó-ja/ 'a closed-shaped bell's → Suzunoya (Note: Motoori Norinaga's study room in Matsusaka.)'), {haru no → Harunoya} + oboro → Harunoya Oboro (春廼舎朧; /{háɾɯ no → haɾɯ-nó-ja} + oboɾo → haɾɯ-no-ja oboɾo/ '{springtime's → Harunoya} + hazy → Tsubouchi Shōyō'), Soga no → Soganoya (曾我廼家; /soɡa no → soɡa-nó-ja/ 'Soga's → Soganoya (Note: A comedy family.)'), etc.
- kori → koriya (凝り→凝り屋; /koɾí → koɾí-ja/ 'getting muscle stiffness → muscle stiffness → an obsessive perfectionist'), jimu → jimuya (事務→事務屋; /ʑímɯ → ʑimɯ́-ja ~ ʑimɯ-ja/ 'deskwork → a robotic bureaucrat'), etc.

In quadrimoraic or longer shop and stage family names and derogatory terms, ‑ya tends to be dominant and deaccenting:

- omodaka → Omodakaya (Note: A kabuki family.) (沢瀉→沢瀉屋; /omodaka → omodaka-ja/ 'a threeleaf arrowhead → Omodakaya'), Harima → Harimaya (播磨→播磨屋; /háɾima → haɾima-ja/), Mikawa → Mikawaya (三河→三河屋; /míkawa → mikawa-ja/), Takashima → Takashimaya (Note: Also a kabuki family.) (高島→高島屋; /takáɕima ~ takaɕima → takaɕima-ja/), etc.
- kidori → kidoriya (気取り→気取り屋; /kidoɾi → kidoɾi-ja/ 'affecting → affectation → a snob'), wakarazu → wakarazuya (分からず→分からず屋; /wakáɾazɯ → wakaɾazɯ-ja/ 'not making sense → a pigheaded person'), etc.

‑ya ('a shop → a supplier') works similarly, with some exceptions:

- It is preaccenting in most trimoraic compounds:
  - kutsu → kutsuya (靴→靴屋; /kɯ̥tsɯ́ → kɯ̥tsɯ́-ja/ 'a shoe → a shoe shop → a shoemaker'), kome → komeya (米→米屋; /komé → komé-ja/ 'rice → a rice shop → a rice dealer'), niku → nikuya (肉→肉屋; /nikɯ́ → nikɯ́-ja/ 'meat → a meat shop → a butcher'), hana → hanaya (花→花屋; /haná → haná-ja/ 'a flower → a flower shop → a florist'), furo → furoya (風呂→風呂屋; /ɸɯɾó ~ ɸɯ́ɾo → ɸɯɾó-ja/ 'a hot bath → a public bathhouse'), etc.
  - kasa → kasaya (傘→傘屋; /kása → kasá-ja/ 'an umbrella → an umbrella shop → an umbrella dealer'), soba → sobaya (蕎麦→蕎麦屋; /sóba → sobá-ja/ 'soba → a soba shop → a soba seller'), tane → taneya (種→種屋; /táne → tané-ja/ 'seed → a seed shop → a seedsman'), hon → hon'ya (本→本屋; /hóN → hóN-ja/ 'a book → a bookshop → a bookdealer'), pan → pan'ya (パン→パン屋; /páN → páN-ja/ 'bread → a bakery → a baker'), yane → yaneya (屋根→屋根屋; /jáne → jané-ja/ 'a roof → a roofer'), etc.
  - But:
    - ishi → ishiya (石→石屋; /iɕí → iɕi-ja/ 'stone → a stone shop → a stonemason'), yado → yadoya (宿→宿屋; /jádo → jado-ja/ 'lodging → an inn'), etc.
    - ito → itoya (糸→糸屋; /íto → itó-ja ~ ito-ja/ 'thread → a thread shop → a thread dealer'), oke → okeya (桶→桶屋; /óke → oke-ja ~ oké-ja/ 'a bucket → a bucket shop → a cooper'), tabi → tabiya (足袋→足袋屋; /tábi → tabí-ja ~ tabi-ja/ 'a tabi → a tabi shop → a tabi maker'), etc.
    - gyū → gyūya (牛→牛屋; /ɡjɯ́R → ɡjɯR-já/ 'beef → a beef shop → a beef butcher'), kon → kon'ya (紺→紺屋; /kóN → koN-ja ~ koN-já ~ koR-ja ~ koR-já/ 'navy blue → a dye shop → a dyer'), etc.
- It is deaccenting in most quadrimoraic or longer compounds, especially if the modifier is originally final-accented:
  - furugi → furugiya (古着→古着屋; /ɸɯɾɯɡi ~ ɸɯɾɯɡí → ɸɯɾɯɡi-ja/ 'secondhand clothes → a secondhand-clothes shop → a secondhand-clothes dealer'), ōgi → ōgiya (扇→扇屋; /oRɡí ~ oRɡi → oRɡi-ja/ 'a hand fan → a hand-fan shop → a hand-fan dealer'), etc.
  - oden → oden'ya (御田→御田屋; /odéN → odeN-ja/ 'oden → an oden shop → an oden seller'), omocha → omochaya (玩具→玩具屋; /omócɕa → omocɕa-ja/ 'a toy → a toy shop'), satō → satōya (砂糖→砂糖屋; /satóR → satoR-ja/ 'sugar → a sugar dealer'), tategu → tateguya (建具→建具屋; /tatéɡɯ → tateɡɯ-ja/ 'door fittings → a door-fittings shop → a joiner'), etc.
  - ichō → ichōya (衣装→衣装屋; /íɕoR → iɕoR-ja/ 'costume → a costume shop → a costumer'), kingyo → kingyoya (金魚→金魚屋; /kíNɡjo → kiNɡjo-ja/ 'a goldfish → a goldfish seller'), denki → denkiya (電気→電気屋; /déNki → deNki-ja/ 'electricity → an electrical shop → an electrical shop owner'), megane → meganeya (眼鏡→眼鏡屋; /méɡane → meɡane-ja/ 'eyeglasses → an optician's shop → an optician'), etc.
  - chōchin → chōchin'ya (提灯→提灯屋; /cɕoRcɕíN → cɕoRcɕiN-ja/ 'a paper lantern → a lantern shop → a lantern maker'), rekōdo → rekōdoya (レコード→レコード屋; /ɾekóRdo ~ ɾékoRdo → ɾekoRdo-ja/ 'a record → a record shop'), bunbōgu → bunbōguya (文房具→文房具屋; /bɯNbóRɡɯ → bɯNboRɡɯ-ja/ 'stationery → a stationery shop → a stationer'), kurīningu → kurīninguya (クリーニング→クリーニング屋; /kɯɾíRniNɡɯ ~ kɯɾiRníNɡɯ → kɯɾiRniNɡɯ-ja/ 'laundering → a laundry → a launderer'), etc.
  - But: ryōri → ryōriya (料理→料理屋; /ɾjóRɾi → ɾjoRɾí-ja/ 'cookery → a restaurant'), mizugashi → mizugashiya (水菓子→水菓子屋; /mizɯɡáɕi → mizɯɡaɕí-ja/ 'fruit → a fruit shop'), aomono → aomonoya (青物→青物屋; /aómono → aomono-ja ~ aomóno-ja ~ aomonó-ja/ 'greens → a greengrocery → a greengrocer'), etc.

=== Long Sino-Japanese occupational titles and establishment types ===
Long (two kanji long or longer) Sino-Japanese occupational titles ("Doctor Ono," "Master Yamada," "Emperor Reiwa," etc) and establishment types ("Satō's Shop," "Yoshida's Barbershop," etc) are generally recessive or even non-compoundifying (see Japanese pitch accent rules § Non-compoundified compounds), but accented titles have been made dominant by some younger speakers. The following is a non-exhaustive list of examples:

- kachō (課長; /kacɕoR/ 'a section chief'):
  - Yamada → Yamada Kachō (山田→山田課長; /jamada → jamada kacɕoR/), etc.
  - Nakagawa → Nakagawa Kachō (中川→中川課長; /nakáɡawa → nakáɡawa kacɕoR/), etc.
  - Satō → Satō Kachō (佐藤→佐藤課長; /sátoR → sátoR kacɕoR/), etc.
- sensei (先生; /seNséi/ 'a learned person'):
  - Ono → Ono Sensei (小野→小野先生; /ono → ono seNséi/), Yamada → Yamada Sensei (山田→山田先生; /jamada → jamada seNséi/), etc.
  - Nakagawa → Nakagawa Sensei (中川→中川先生; /nakáɡawa → nakáɡawa seNsei ~ nakáɡawa | seNséi ~ nakaɡawa seNséi/), etc.
  - Hara → Hara Sensei (原→原先生; /háɾa → háɾa seNsei ~ háɾa | seNséi ~ haɾa seNséi/), Satō → Satō Sensei (佐藤→佐藤先生; /sátoR → sátoR seNsei ~ sátoR | seNséi ~ satoR seNséi/), Andō → Andō Sensei (安藤→安藤先生; /áNdoR → áNdoR seNsei ~ áNdoR | seNséi ~ aNdoR seNséi/), etc.
- meijin (名人; /meiʑíN/ 'a Japanese-board-game master'): Takahashi → Takahashi Meijin (高橋→高橋名人; /takáhaɕi → takáhaɕi meiʑiN ~ takáhaɕi | meiʑíN ~ takahaɕi meiʑíN/), etc.
- hakushi (博士; /hákɯ̥ɕi/ 'an academic doctor'): Takahashi → Takahashi Hakushi (高橋→高橋博士; /takáhaɕi → takáhaɕi̥ hakɯ̥ɕi ~ takáhaɕi̥ | hákɯ̥ɕi ~ takahaɕi̥ hákɯ̥ɕi/), etc.
- tennō (天皇; /teNnóR/ 'an emperor of Japan'):
  - Ōjin Tennō (応神天皇; /oRʑiN teNnóR/ 'Emperor Ōjin'), etc.
  - Jinmu Tennō (神武天皇; /ʑíNmɯ teNnoR ~ ʑíNmɯ | teNnóR ~ ʑiNmɯ teNnóR/ 'Emperor Jinmu'), etc.
- shōten (商店; /ɕóRteN/ 'a store'):
  - Yamada → Yamada Shōten (山田→山田商店; /jamada → jamada ɕóRteN/), etc.
  - Nakagawa → Nakagawa Shōten (中川→中川商店; /nakáɡawa → nakáɡawa ɕoRteN ~ nakáɡawa | ɕóRteN ~ nakaɡawa ɕóRteN/), etc.
  - Satō → Satō Shōten (佐藤→佐藤商店; /sátoR → sátoR ɕoRteN ~ sátoR | ɕóRteN ~ satoR ɕóRteN/), etc.

=== Pluralizing suffixes ===
==== ‑ra and ‑tachi ====
‑ra (等; /ɾá/) and ‑tachi (達) tend to be dominant and preaccenting, except after some initial-accented pronouns:

- kimi → kimira; kimitachi (君→君等・君達; /kimi → kimí-ɾa; kimí-tacɕi ~ kimi-tácɕi/ 'you, my dear → you, my dears'), kodomo → kodomatchi (子供→子供達; /kodomo → kodomó-tacɕi/ 'the child → the children'), etc.
- otoko → otokora (男→男等; /otokó → otokó-ɾa/ 'the male person → the male people'), anata → anatatachi (貴方→貴方達; /anáta → anatá-tacɕi/ 'you, my respectable peer/inferior → you, my respectable peers/inferiors'), etc.
- But: boku → bokura; bokutachi (僕→僕等・僕達; /bókɯ ~ bokɯ → bókɯ-ɾa; bókɯ̥-tacɕi/ 'I/me, your polite male peer/superior → we/us including me, your polite male peer/superior'), ware → warera (我→我等; /wáɾe → wáɾe-ɾa/ 'I/me, elevatedly speaking → we/us, elevatedly speaking'), etc.

==== ‑domo ====
Tomo → ‑domo (共; /tomo ~ tómo/ 'together') tend to be dominant and initial-accented, except after some initial-accented nouns and except in some quadrimoraic compounds:

- temae → temaedomo (手前→手前共; /temae → temae-dómo ~ temáe-domo/ 'you son of a gun → you sons of guns'), watakushi → watakushidomo (私→私共; /watakɯ̥ɕi ~ wataɕi → watakɯ̥ɕi dómo ~ wataɕi-dómo/ 'I/me, my formally polite self → we/us including me, my formally polite self'), otoko → otokodomo (男→男共; /otokó → otoko-dómo/ 'the male person → the male people'), etc.
- nyōbo → nyōbodomo (女房→女房共; /njóRbo → njoRbo-dómo/ 'the lady-in-waiting → the ladies-in-waiting'), etc.
- But:
  - shinja → shinjadomo (信者→信者共; /ɕíNʑa → ɕíNʑa-domo/ 'the believer → the believers'), etc.
  - tori → toridomo (鳥→鳥共; /toɾi → toɾi-dómo ~ toɾí-domo/ 'the bird → the birds'), mono → monodomo (者→者共; /monó → monó-domo/ 'the person → the people'), mago → magodomo (孫→孫共; /maɡó → maɡó-domo/ 'the grandchild → the grandchildren'), etc.

==== ‑gata and ‑bara ====
Kata → ‑gata (方; /katá/ 'a direction → that respectable person') and ‑bara (輩) tend to be dominant, and either deaccenting or preaccenting:

- omae → omaegata (御前→御前方; /omae → omae-ɡata ~ omaé-ɡata/ 'ye/you, a respectable person → ye/you, respectable people'), etc.
- yatsu → yatsubara (奴→奴原; /játsɯ → jatsɯ́-baɾa ~ jatsɯ-baɾa/ 'the son of a gun → the sons of guns'), yakunin → yakuninbara (役人→役人輩; /jakɯniN → jakɯniN-baɾa ~ jakɯníN-baɾa/ 'the bureaucrat → the bureaucrats'), etc.

=== Nominalizing suffixes ===
==== ‑sa ====
‑sa tends to make unaccented nouns out of unaccented adjectival attributives and nouns:

- atsui → atsusa (厚い→厚さ; 'that is thick → thickness'): /atsɯi → atsɯ̥sa/
- amai → amasa (甘い→甘さ; 'that is sweet → sweetness'): /amai → amasa/
- tsumetai → tsumetasa (冷たい→冷たさ; 'that is cold → coldness'): /tsɯmetai → tsɯmetasa/
- kanashī → kanashisa (悲しい→悲しさ; 'that is sad → sadness'): /kanaɕiR ~ kanaɕíR → kanaɕi̥sa ~ kanáɕi̥sa ~ kanaɕí̥sa/
- aimai → aimaisa (曖昧→曖昧さ; 'ambiguous → ambiguity'): /aimai → aimaisa/
- kenkō → kenkōsa (健康→健康さ; 'healthy → healthiness'): /keNkoR → keNkoRsa/
- seikaku → seikakusa (正確→正確さ; 'accurate → accuracy'): /seikakɯ → seikakɯ̥sa/

Out of accented adjectival attributives, it tends to create minimally antepenultimate-accented nouns if the mora count permits. Optional rightward shifts may occur:

- yoi → yosa (良い→良さ; 'that is good → goodness'): /jói → jósa/
- atsui → atsusa (熱い→熱さ; 'that is hot → hotness'): /atsɯ́i → átsɯ̥sa/
- takai → takasa (高い→高さ; 'that is high → height'): /takái → tákasa/
- chikai → chikasa (近い→近さ; 'that is near → proximity'): /cɕi̥kái → cɕí̥kasa → cɕi̥kása/
- fukai → fukasa (深い→深さ; 'that is deep → depth'): /ɸɯ̥kái → ɸɯ̥́kasa → ɸɯ̥kása/

Quadrimoraic adjective-based nouns are additionally penultimate-accented:

- surudoi → surudosa (鋭い→鋭さ; 'that is sharp → sharpness'): /sɯɾɯdói → sɯɾɯ́dosa ~ sɯɾɯdósa/
- medetai → medetesa (目出度い→目出度さ; 'that is auspicious → auspiciousness'): /medetái → medétasa ~ medetása/
- omoshiroi → omoshirosa (面白い→面白さ; 'that is enjoyable → enjoyability'): /omoɕiɾói → omoɕíɾosa ~ omoɕiɾósa/
- arigatai → arigatasa (有り難い→有り難さ; 'that is worthwhile → worth'): /aɾiɡatái → aɾiɡátasa ~ aɾiɡatása/
- ureshī → ureshisa (嬉しい→嬉しさ; 'that is joyous → joy'): /ɯɾeɕíR → ɯɾéɕi̥sa ~ ɯɾeɕí̥sa/

Out of accented adjectival nouns, ‑sa tends to make penultimate-accented nouns:

- aware → awaresa (哀れ→哀れさ; 'pitiable → pitiability'): /áwaɾe → awaɾésa/
- oroka → orokasa (愚か→愚かさ; 'foolish → folly'): /óɾoka → oɾokása/
- yutaka → yutakasa (豊か→豊かさ; 'abundant → abundance'): /jɯ́taka → jɯtakása/
- sukoyaka → sukoyakasa (健やか→健やかさ; 'healthy → healthiness'): /sɯ̥kójaka → sɯ̥kojakása/
- ganko → gankosa (頑固→頑固さ; 'obstinate → obstinacy'): /ɡáNko → ɡaNkósa/
- genki → genkisa (元気→元気さ; 'vigorous → vigor'): /ɡéNki → ɡeNkí̥sa/

==== ‑mi ====
‑mi (味) tends to make unaccented nouns out of unaccented adjectival attributives and nouns:

- akai → akami (赤い→赤み; 'that is red → redness'): /akai → akami/
- akarui → akarumi (明るい→明るみ; 'that is bright → a bright place'): /akaɾɯi → akaɾɯmi/
- shinken → shinkenmi (真剣→真剣み; 'serious → seriousness'): /ɕiNkeN → ɕiNkeNmi ~ ɕiNkéNmi/

Nouns based on accented adjectival attributives and nouns tend to be final-accented. Quadrimoraic or longer ones are additionally penultimate-accented or unaccented:

- karai → karami (辛い→辛み; 'that is spicy → spiciness'): /kaɾái → kaɾamí ~ kaɾami/
- shibui → shibumi (渋い→渋み; 'that is astringent → astringency'): /ɕibɯ́i → ɕibɯmí/
- tsuyoi → tsuyomi (強い→強み; 'that is strong → strength'): /tsɯjói → tsɯjomí/
- nigai → nigami (苦い→苦み; 'that is bitter → bitterness'): /niɡái → niɡamí ~ niɡami/
- fukai → fukami (深い→深み; 'that is deep → depth'): /ɸɯ̥kái → ɸɯ̥kamí ~ ɸɯ̥kámi ~ ɸɯ̥kami/
- yowai → yowami (弱い→弱み; 'that is weak → weakness'): /jowái → jowamí/
- omoshiroi → omoshiromi (面白い→面白み; 'that is enjoyable → enjoyability'): /omoɕiɾói → omoɕiɾomí ~ omoɕiɾómi ~ omoɕiɾomi/
- arigatai → arigatami (有り難い→有り難み; 'that is worthwhile → worth'): /aɾiɡatái → aɾiɡatamí ~ aɾiɡatámi ~ aɾiɡatami/
- iya → iyami (嫌→嫌み; 'disagreeable → disagreeability'): /ijá → ijamí ~ ijami/
- shisetsu → shinsetsumi (親切→親切み; 'kind → kindness'): /ɕíNsetsɯ → ɕiNsetsɯmí ~ ɕiNsetsɯ́mi ~ ɕiNsetsɯmi/

==== ‑ke/‑ge ====
‑ke/‑ge (気; /ké ~ ke/ 'an air') tends to make unaccented nouns out of originally unaccented source words:

- kaze → kazeke ~ kazake (風邪→風邪気; 'the common cold → a whiff of a cold'): /kaze → kazeke ~ kazake/
- mizu → mizuke (水→水気; 'water → an air of moisture'): /mizɯ → mizɯke/
- hito → hitoke ~ hitoge (人→人気; 'a person → an air of human presence'): /hi̥to → hi̥toke ~ hi̥toɡe/
- abura → aburake (油→油気; 'oil → a whiff of oiliness'): /abɯɾa → abɯɾake/
- otona → otonage (大人→大人気; 'an adult person → an air of maturity'): /otona → otonaɡe/
- oboro → oboroge (朧→朧気; 'hazy'): /oboɾo → oboɾoɡe/
- nemui → nemuke (眠い→眠気; 'that is sleepy → a sense of sleepiness'): /nemɯi → nemɯke/
- abunai → abunage (危ない→危な気; 'that is dangerous → an air of danger'): /abɯnai → abɯnaɡe ~ abɯnáɡe/

Trimoraic nouns based on accented source words tend to be final-accented (verbal infinitives are parenthesized):

- iro → iroke (色→色気; 'sex → an air of sexiness'): /iɾó → iɾoké/
- kui → kuike (食い→食い気; 'eating → an appetite'): /(kɯ́i) → kɯí → kɯiké/
- (haki) → hakike ((吐き)→吐き気; '(vomiting) → a sense of nausea'): /(háki) → haki̥ké/
- samui → samuke (寒い→寒気; 'that is cold → an air of chilliness'): /samɯ́i → samɯké/
- oshī → oshige (惜しい→惜し気; 'that is too dear to lose → an air of too much worth to lose'): /oɕíR → oɕiɡé ~ oɕiɡe/

While quadrimoraic or longer nouns tend to be penultimate-accented:

- ureshī → ureshige (嬉しい→嬉し気; 'that is joyous → an air of joy'): /ɯɾeɕíR → ɯɾeɕíɡe/
- kurushī → kurushige (苦しい→苦し気; 'that is laborious → an air of laboriousness'): /kɯɾɯɕíR → kɯɾɯɕíɡe/
- natsukashī → natsukashige (懐かしい→懐かし気; 'that is nostalgically dear → an air of nostalgia'): /natsɯ̥kaɕíR → natsɯ̥kaɕíɡe ~ natsɯ̥kaɕiɡé ~ natsɯ̥kaɕiɡe/

==== ‑me ====
‑me (目; /mé/ '‑ishness') tends to make unaccented nouns out of originally unaccented adjectival attributives:

- katai → katame (固い→固め; 'that is hard → fortification'): /katai ~ katái → katame/

And final-accented or unaccented nouns out of originally accented attributives:

- {ooi → ōi} → ōme (多い→多め; 'that is abundant → a largish amount'): /{oói → óRi} → oRmé ~ oRme/
- karai → karame (辛い→辛め; 'that is spicy → spicyishness'): /kaɾái → kaɾamé ~ kaɾame/
- sukunai → sukuname (少ない→少なめ; 'that is scarce → a smallish amount'): /sɯ̥kɯnái → sɯ̥kɯname/
- ōkī → ōkime (大きい→大きめ; 'that is large → largishness'): /oRkíR → oRkime/
- chīsai → chīsame (小さい→小さめ; 'that is small → smallishness'): /cɕiRsái → cɕiRsame/

=== Verbalizing and adjectivalizing suffixes ===
Verbalizers and adjectivalizers generally make accented verbs and adjectives:

- iyagaru (嫌がる; /ija-ɡáɾɯ/ 'resents'), samugaru (寒がる; /samɯ-ɡáɾɯ/ 'is sensitive to the cold'), ureshigaru (嬉しがる; /ɯɾeɕi-ɡáɾɯ/ 'shows joy'), etc.
- asebamu (汗ばむ; /ase-bámɯ/ 'gets sweaty'), keshikibamu (気色ばむ; /keɕi̥ki-bámɯ/ 'grows angrily red'), etc.
- furubiru (古びる; /ɸɯɾɯ-bíɾɯ/ 'grows old'), inakabiru (田舎びる; /inaka-bíɾɯ/ 'seems rustic'), etc.
- tokimeku (時めく; /toki-mékɯ/ 'peaks in success'), kirameku (煌めく; /kiɾa-mékɯ/ 'sparkles'), etc.
- hanayagu (華やぐ; /hana-jáɡɯ/ 'is lively'), nagoyagu (和やぐ; /naɡo-jáɡɯ/ 'gets gentler'), etc.
- kakushikibaru; shikakubaru (格式張る・四角張る; /kakɯɕi̥ki-báɾɯ; ɕi̥kakɯ-báɾɯ/ 'is stuffily formal'), etc.
- teisaiburu; mottaiburu (体裁振る・勿体振る; /teisai-bɯ́ɾɯ; moQtai-bɯ́ɾɯ/ 'puts on airs'), etc.
- akajimiru (垢染みる; /aka-ʑimíɾɯ/ 'seems dirty'), kodomojimiru (子供染みる; /kodomo-ʑimíɾɯ/ 'seems childish'), shotaijimiru (所帯染みる; /ɕotai-ʑimíɾɯ/ 'seems like a domestic person'), kichigaijimiru (気違い染みる; /ki̥cɕiɡai-ʑimíɾɯ/ 'seems like a crazy person'), etc.
- shimogakaru (下掛かる; /ɕimo-ɡakáɾɯ/ 'talks dirty'), shibaigakaru (芝居掛かる; /ɕibai-ɡakáɾɯ/ 'is melodramatic'), jidaigakaru (時代掛かる; /ʑidai-ɡakáɾɯ/ 'is inorganically old-fashioned'), etc.
- chōshizuku (調子付く; /cɕoRɕi-zɯ́kɯ/ 'hits one's stride'), ojikezuku (怖じ気付く; /oʑike-zɯ́kɯ/ 'gets cold feet'), etc.
- marukkoi (丸っこい; /maɾɯ-Qkói/ 'is curvy'), aburakkoi (油っこい; /abɯɾa-Qkói/ 'is greasy'), madaru(k)koi (間怠(っ)こい; /madaɾɯ(Q)kói/ 'is sluggish'), natsu(k)koi (懐(っ)こい; /natsɯ̥(Q)kói// 'is amiable'), etc.
- imamekashī (今めかしい; /ima-mekaɕíR/ 'is modern in style'), furumekashī (古めかしい; /ɸɯɾɯ-mekaɕíR/ 'is old-fashioned'), etc.
- oshitsukegamashī (押し付けがましい; /oɕitsɯ̥ke-ɡamaɕíR/ 'is pushy'), mirengamashī (未練がましい; /miɾeN-ɡamaɕíR/ 'is unwilling to let go'), etc.
- mirentarashī (未練たらしい; /miɾeN-taɾaɕíR/ 'is unwilling to let go'), binbōtarashī (貧乏たらしい; /biNboR-taɾaɕíR/ 'is apparently poor'), etc.
- aokusai (青臭い; /ao-kɯ̥sái/ 'smells green → is inexperienced'), inaka(k)kusai (田舎(っ)臭い; /inaka-(Q)kɯ̥sái/ 'seems rustic'), toshiyorikusai (年寄り臭い; /toɕijoɾi-kɯ̥sái/ 'seems like a fogy'), jimankusai (自慢臭い; /ʑimaN-kɯ̥sái/ 'seems boastful'), shōbenkusai (小便臭い; /ɕoRbeN-kɯ̥sái/ 'smells of urine → is childish'), etc.
- iroppoi (色っぽい; /iɾo-Qpói/ 'is sexy'), honeppoi (骨っぽい; /hone-Qpói/ 'is bony'), kodomoppoi (子供っぽい; /kodomo-Qpói/ 'is childish'), okorippoi (怒りっぽい; /okoɾi-Qpói/ 'is grumpy'), kuroppoi (黒っぽい; /kɯɾo-Qpói/ 'is blackish'), shiroppoi (白っぽい; /ɕiɾo-Qpói/ 'is whitish'), yasuppoi (安っぽい; /jasɯ̥-Qpói/ 'is cheapish'), etc.
  - But if the suffixed word is originally unaccented: mizuppoi (水っぽい; /mizɯ-Qpói ~ mizɯ-Qpoi/ 'is watery'), shimeppoi (湿っぽい; /ɕime-Qpói ~ ɕime-Qpoi/ 'is damp'), wasureppoi (忘れっぽい; /wasɯɾe-Qpói ~ wasɯɾe-Qpoi/ 'is forgetful'), arappoi (荒っぽい; /aɾa-Qpói ~ aɾa-Qpoi/ 'is unruly'), etc.

== Bibliography ==
- Akinaga, Kazue (20 December 1998) [25 April 1998]. 共通語のアクセント. In NHK Broadcasting Culture Research Institute (ed.). NHK日本語発音アクセント辞典 新版 (in Japanese) (5th ed.). Shibuya, Tokyo: NHK Publishing. pp. 174–221. ISBN 4-14-011112-7.
- Hirayama, Teruo, ed. (15 September 2010) [30 June 1960]. 全国アクセント辞典 (in Japanese) (31st ed.). Chiyoda, Tokyo: Tokyodo Shuppan. ISBN 978-4-490-10023-5.
- Kindaichi, Haruhiko; Akinaga, Kazue, eds. (1 April 2025) [10 April 2014]. 新明解日本語アクセント辞典 (in Japanese) (2nd ed.). Chiyoda, Tokyo: Sanseido. ISBN 978-4-385-13468-0.
- Martin, Samuel Elmo (2004) [1975]. A Reference Grammar of Japanese (revised ed.). Honolulu: University of Hawai'i Press. ISBN 0-8248-2818-6.
- NHK Broadcasting Culture Research Institute, ed. (20 June 2025) [25 May 2016]. NHK日本語発音アクセント新辞典 (in Japanese) (15th ed.). Shibuya, Tokyo: NHK Publishing. ISBN 978-4-14-011345-5.
