= Kuwai =

Japanese plant

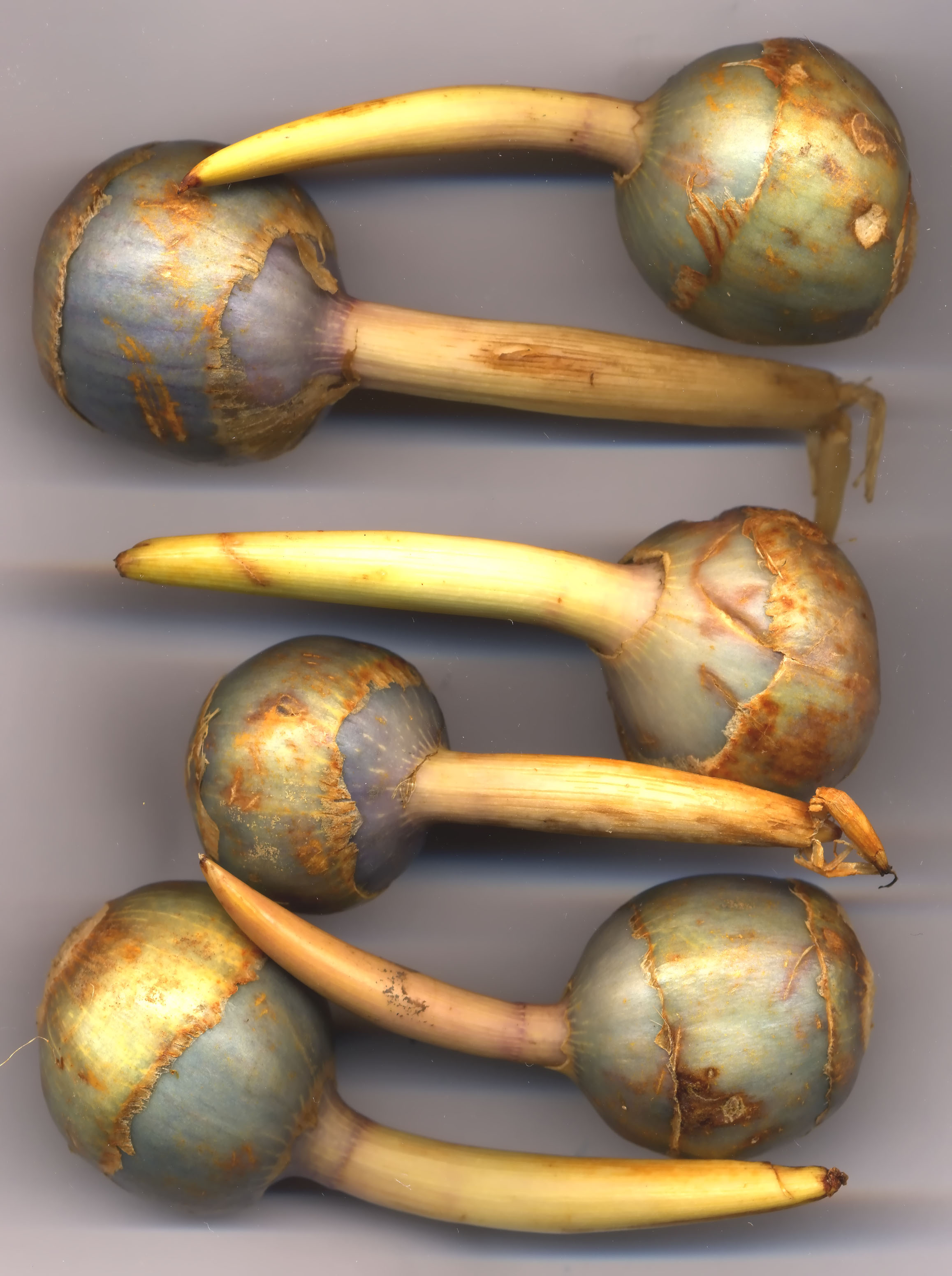
kuwai underground stem

Kuwai (Japanese: クワイ) is a Japanese plant whose underground stem (rhizome) is edible. It is a cultivar of Sagittaria trifolia. It has different common names in different regions of Japan. The underground stems of this neighboring species are also eaten in China.

Kuwai and Chinese cígū (慈姑) are different cultivars, but both are treated as kuwai in Japan and cígū in China. The etymology of the Japanese name kuwai is uncertain.

== Classification ==
Kuwai is a cultivar of Sagittaria trifolia. Its scientific name is Sagittaria trifolia L. 'Caerulea.' However, it is sometimes treated the same as another cultivar or as the same as Sagittaria trifolia. On the contrary, some scholars have assumed it to be Sagittaria sagittifolia without acknowledging Sagittaria trifolia.

The cultivar Sagittaria trifolia was created in China. For this reason, the origin of kuwai is considered to be China. It is cultivated as a vegetable only in China and Japan. In Japan, it has been actively cultivated since the Edo period.

Chinese kuwai is white, and its underground stem is larger than the Japanese one. This underground stem is also edible in China. It is cultivated only in Japan, but it is called shiro(white)-kuwai to distinguish it from Japanese kuwai. In contrast, Japanese kuwai is sometimes called ao kuwai to distinguish it from Chinese kuwai. In Japan, the scientific name of the white kuwai is often given as Sagittaria trifolia L. 'Sinensis', while the same species is known as Sagittaria sagittifolia subsp. leucopetala in China.

In Japan, three varieties of kuwai are grown: the blue-violet ao kuwai, the pale blue shiro kuwai, and the small Suita kuwai. All are grown in paddy fields.

Ao kuwai
This is the most common variety grown in Japan. Its grass is relatively short, and its leaves are medium-sized and green. Its tuber is oblong, and its outer skin is blue. Among the ao kuwai strains, the one with a flat bottom of the tuber is called Shinden kuwai, and the slightly waist-high, round-bellied strain is called Kyo kuwai. The underground stem weighs 6 g.

Shiro kuwai
This variety is widely grown in China and is rarely seen in Japan. It is a tall plant with large, light green leaves. The tuber is white in color, round and spherical, and its flesh is tougher than that of ao kuwai and has a crunchy texture. Its taste is light and bitter. It is used as an ingredient in Chinese cuisine. The weight of the underground stem is 28g.

Suita kuwai
The closest wild variety of kuwai to Omodaka, with smaller tubers but denser flesh and less bitterness, and said to have a good taste. It is also said to be a strain of Omodaka The botanist Tomitaro Makino gave it the scientific name as a variety of omodaka, which was cultivated in Japan apart from the introduced lineage. The weight of the underground stem is 4 g.

== Distribution ==
As mentioned above, the distribution of kuwai varies greatly depending on how it is classified. If we consider it Sagittaria sagittifolia, it is widely distributed in Asia, Europe, the Americas, and other regions of the world, from temperate to tropical across the globe. The wild species Sagittaria trifolia is believed to be native to Southeast Asia. The cultivated variety kuwai was created in China. For this reason, the origin of kuwai is China. The areas where it is cultivated as a vegetable are limited to China and Japan. In Japan, it has been actively cultivated since the Edo period.

== Plant life ==
=== Plant forms ===
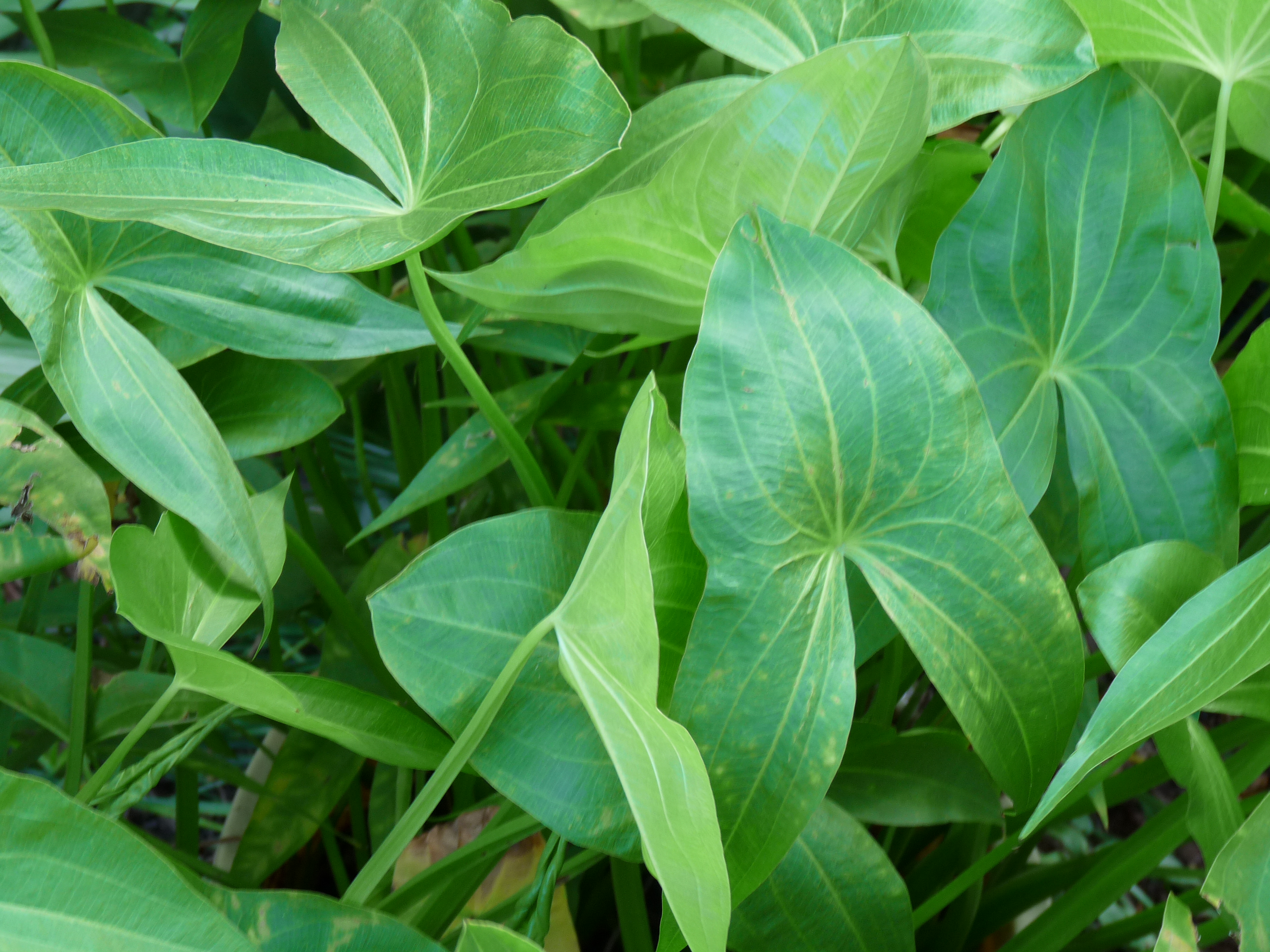
Kuwai leaves.

Ao kuwai, a typical Japanese kuwai, is a monocotyledonous perennial aquatic plant, growing to about 110 - 125 centimeters (cm) in height. The leaves are 30 cm long, arrowhead-shaped without notches, and the leaf blade has a spongy interior. Stolon arise from each node of the stem and grow up to 60 – 80 cm long. Nodes are also found on the creeping stem, from which two or three secondary creeping stems arise. Tubers are attached to the tips of the rhizome, which are larger than those of the original omodaka species. The tuber is bluish with horizontal nodules and is surrounded by thin scales with a 5 – 6 cm long apical bud at the tip. The flowers are dioecious. It produces conical inflorescences with white-petaled flowers. Fruiting is almost non-existent after flowering.

=== Growth ===
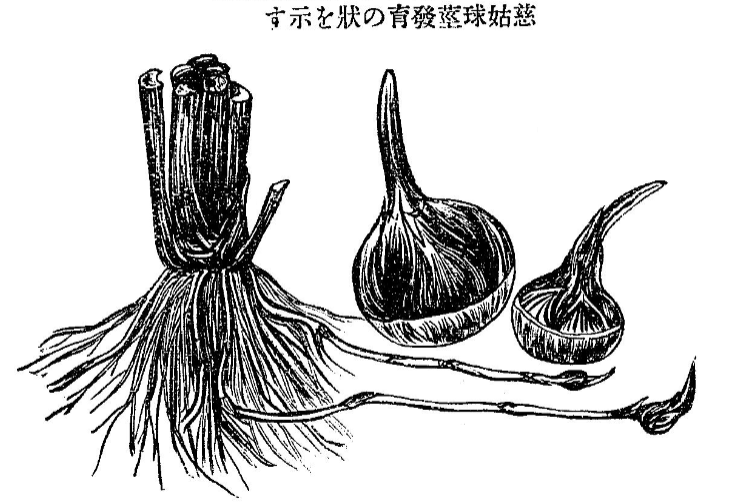
The development of kuwai's underground stem in a 1903 agricultural commentary.

Kuwai is cultivated in paddy fields. Germination of kuwai occurs around early July, when planting takes place, at a germination temperature of 13 °C to 15 °C or higher. The growth of kuwai can be divided into two phases: the vegetative growth phase (July–August), from germination to leaf number increase, and the reproductive growth phase (late August to mid-November), from creeping stem development to tuber enlargement. The optimum temperature for growth during the vegetative growth phase is 20 °C to 30 °C, but the rate of increase in leaf number is temperature-dependent and is accelerated by high temperature conditions. Creeping during the vegetative growth period occurs after 14 to 15 true leaves have developed, followed by the development of one creeping stem for every leaf blade. After the creeping stems have elongated, they form tubers encased in two bracts, which begin to enlarge when daylight hours are shortened and the plant is exposed to low temperatures of around 15 °C. Although the stolons die when exposed to frost, tuber enlargement takes place below the water surface until late fall.

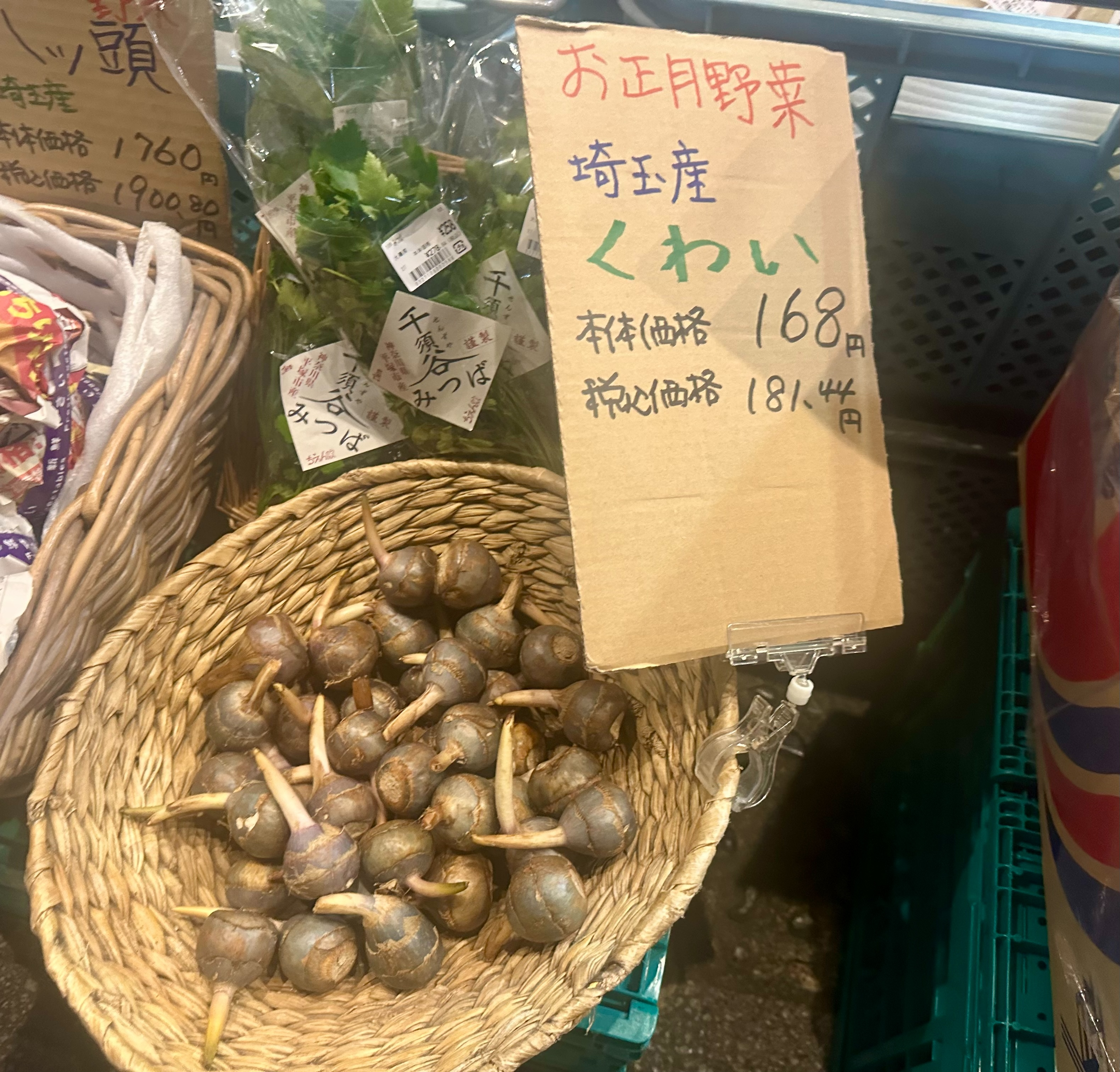
Kuwai tubers from Saitama Prefecture for sale, 2024

== Cultivation ==
It is essential that the field be flooded during the growing season, and good water availability is a necessary condition for cultivation. Semi-wet fields with peat or fine-grained gleysol are suitable, while andosol or sandy soils will reduce yields. Weather conditions should be warm throughout the entire period, and the more significant the daily temperature difference during the tuber growth period, the better and fuller tubers can be produced. In Japan, the best areas for cultivation are south of the southern Kantō region.

Kuwai is planted using tubers that have been harvested and refrigerated the previous year but are removed from the refrigerator one week before planting and acclimated to the open air so that they are not exposed to direct sunlight and do not dry out. Kuwai fields are plowed in April, and two weeks before planting in late June or July, the fields are watered, and the tuber roots are planted after the fields have been padded by raking. Two weeks later, leaves similar to omodaka appear, and the stem and leaves grow vigorously from around late July through September. During this growth period, the rhizomes become fuller and of uniform size through fertilization, which involves moderately thinning the stems and leaves, and cutting some of the underground stems. Water management is also essential, and water is kept at a shallow depth of 5 cm immediately after planting and in the fall, and at a slightly shallower depth of 6 to 9 cm in the summer during the growing season, so as not to run out of water. When temperatures drop in late fall and the leaves become frostbitten, tuberous root enlargement ceases and it is time to harvest.

The harvesting method is similar to that of lotus root, using water pressure from a power pump to dig up the rhizomes in the mud below the surface of the water and separate the rhizomes that come to the surface from the stems to avoid damaging the shoots. Alternatively, the water is dropped. The above-ground parts are harvested, leaving the field flooded once until harvesting, and the rhizomes are dug up after the water is wholly dropped when harvesting. Seed balls, which are reserved for planting the following year, are stored in vaults in underground pits or refrigerator storage.

Diseases and pests are known to affect significantly yield, including red blight by Fusarium species, leaf blight by Marssonina species in the mid-season, and aphids from September onward. Immediately after planting, the crop may be subjected to feeding damage by the duckweed. Although there are few problems with continuous cropping, continuous cropping in fields where red blight has occurred is discouraged.

=== Producing area ===
The two main production areas in Japan are Hiroshima and Saitama prefectures, which account for more than 80% of the market. The most significant production volume in Japan is in Fukuyama City, Hiroshima Prefecture, where it spread in the early Showa period as a post-crop of igusa, and became a local specialty around 1955. Because it is grown in time for the New Year when demand is high, shipments peak from late November to December. There has been little differentiation in crop types, with some cultivating earlier planting (September–October shipments.)

- Fukuyama, Hiroshima Prefecture
- Koshigaya, Saitama Prefecture – The second largest producer after Fukuyama City.
- Kyoto Prefecture – It is selected as Kyoyasai.
- Kanazawa, Ishikawa Prefecture – Certified as a Kaga vegetable.
- Hakui, Ishikawa, Ishikawa Prefecture
- Tozawa, Yamagata Prefecture
- Kadoma, Osaka, Osaka Prefecture
- Suita, Osaka Prefecture – Suit-kuwai. The Suita area, a low marshy area along the Yodo River, had many muddy paddies, and small kuwai was a specialty of the area. Until the Meiji Restoration, it was offered to the Imperial Court. After World War II, however, the urbanization of the Suita area led to a decrease in the number of farmers growing it, and for a time, it was on the verge of extinction.

== Usage ==
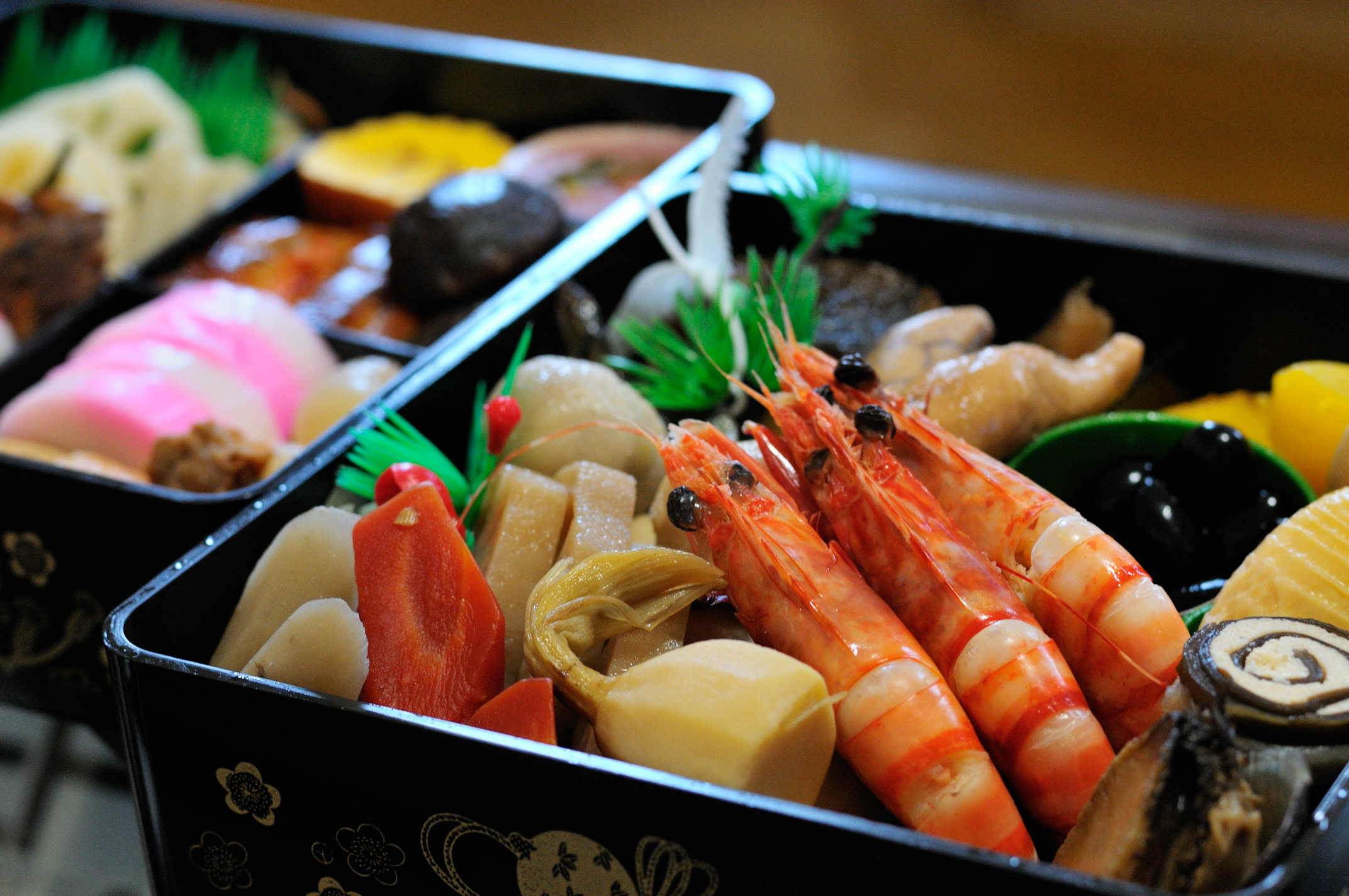
Kuwai stuffed to the left of the shrimp as part of the osechi dish.

In Japan, since "signs of growth" (目が出る) and "seed sprouts" (芽が出る) are pronounced the same (me-ga-deru,) it is considered a good-luck item. Therefore, it is customary to make nimono and eat it at Osechi (New Year's dishes), etc.

The season as a foodstuff is from November to April. Good quality sprouts are considered high market value if they grow into a beautiful shape and are shiny all over. The buds are cut diagonally at the tip and left. The bottom of the tuber is thinly sliced and trimmed, then peeled, exposed to water, and cooked after the lye is removed. The tuber has a characteristic bitter taste due to its oxalic acid content, so it is best to boil it once in rice water to remove it. It has a slightly sweet and bitter taste similar to that of chestnuts and lily bulb. It is usually boiled in a broth to enjoy its tender texture. It is also used in deep-fried and nabemono. Processed products include kuwai chips and kuwai shōchū (shochu made from kuwai.)

== History ==
In China, there is a record of it in the Mingyi bielu (名醫別錄) written by Tao Hongjing in the 5th century, and its Chinese name is cí gū (慈姑, The pronunciation on the left is modern and differs from that of the 5th century.)

The date of arrival of kuwai in Japan is unknown, but it is believed to have existed in Japan in the Nara period of the 8th century. The Man'yōshū, Japan's oldest poetry collection composed around 780, contains a poem

While picking egu in a stream in Yamada village for Emperor, my sleeves got wet from the melting snow. (君がため山田の沢にゑぐ摘むと雪消の水にの袖濡れぬ)

Egu is thought by some to be kuwai. Some say they are Japanese parsley.

In old Japanese literature, kuwai is often written as a translation of the Chinese word cí gū (慈姑) or written as today's kuroguwai Eleocharis kuroguwai. It may also refer to the original species, omodaka (Sagittaria trifolia.) Scholars are therefore divided in their interpretations of whether the description in these books is the kuwai of today. The following is an interpretation often presented as a standard theory but may not be a description of kuwai.

In the Honzo Wamyo (本草和名, Japanese name for medicinal herbs) compiled in 918, there is a reference to omodaka (於毛多加.) In another place, it is described as Kurokuwai (久呂久和為.)

On the other hand, Wamyō Ruijushō, compiled around 938, mentions kuwai (久和井.)

Production and use flourished during the Edo period (1603–1867), and the main production areas are thought to be Kyoto, Osaka, and the Edo area, but little is known about the actual situation.

Yamato Honzo (1709, 大和本草) has a section on "Raven potato(烏芋) -kurokuwai(クロクワイ)." The kurokuwai in this book appears to refer to kuwai, not today's kurokuwai, based on the characteristics of the leaf shape.

In Setsuyo Gundan (摂陽群談, 1701), there is a description of "sukitakuwai, it is grown in the paddy fields of Suita Village and sold in the market. It is small in size but tastes delicious."

Kaibara Ekken clearly distinguishes between 慈姑=kuwai and 烏芋kurokuwai, in his book Nabu (菜譜, 1704.) From the description, they seem to be the same as today's kuwai and kurokuwai. There is a description that Suita kuwai is smaller and tastier than common kuwai.

It served as a relief crop during the Great Tenmei famine (1782–1788.)

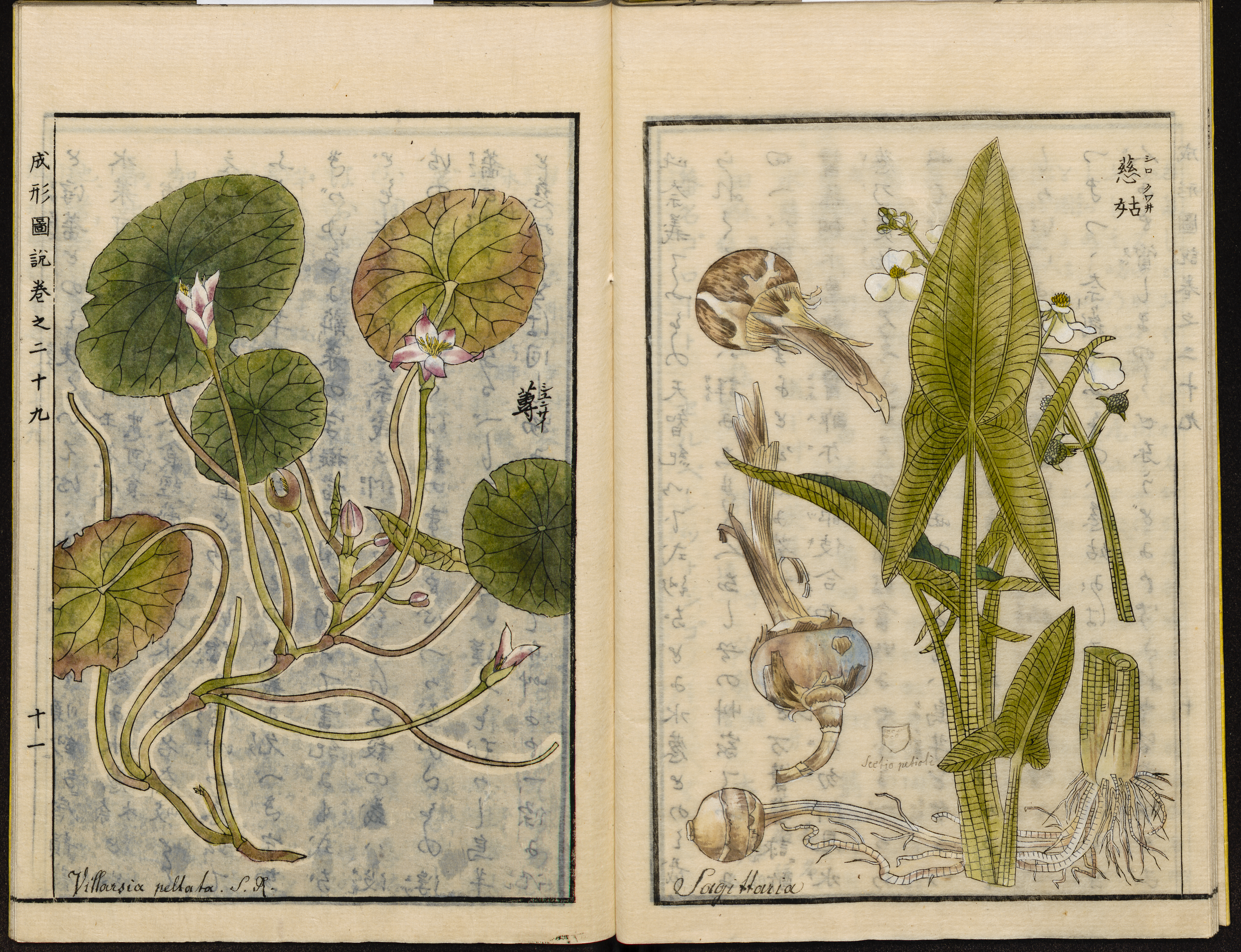
Kuwai in the 1804 Seikei Zusetsu (成形図説, right page).

Goki-nai sanbutsu zue (五畿内産物図絵, 1813) also depict Suitakuwai as an illustration.

Ōta Nanpo (太田南畝, 1749–1823,) who traveled to Osaka during the Edo period, read the following poem;

My memories of Osaka are of hamo boning, surinagashi (ground soup), suitakuwai, and Tennoji turnips.

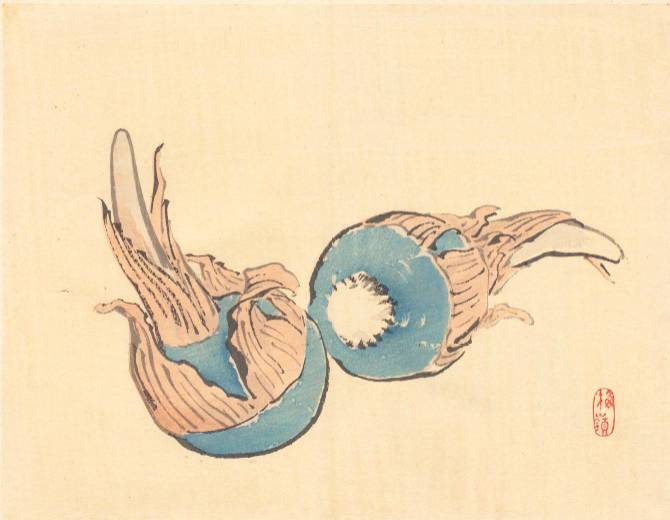
Kuwai painted by Kōno Bairei (1844-1895)

During the Meiji era, Kyoto, Osaka, Saitama, Tokyo, Ibaraki, and Chiba were the main production areas in Japan.

During the Pacific War, kuwai cultivation became one of the controlled items during the war and was suppressed.

Although cultivation was revived after the war, the area cultivated shrank from the prewar level as urbanization progressed and the number of rice paddies in urban areas decreased. Since then, it has been gradually reducing.

=== References ===
- 猪股慶子監修 成美堂出版編集部編 (2012-07-10). かしこく選ぶ・おいしく食べる 野菜まるごと事典. 成美堂出版. ISBN 978-4-415-30997-2.
- 講談社編 (2004), 旬の食材：秋・冬の野菜, 講談社, ISBN 4062701367
- 講談社編 (2013-05-13). からだにやさしい旬の食材 野菜の本. 講談社. pp. 162–163. ISBN 978-4-06-218342-0.
- 主婦の友社編 (2011-02-20). 野菜まるごと大図鑑. 主婦の友社. p. 244. ISBN 978-4-07-273608-1.
- 農文協編 (2004-03-31). 野菜園芸大百科 第2版 20：特産野菜70種. 農山漁村文化協会. pp. 87–95. ISBN 4-540-04123-1.
