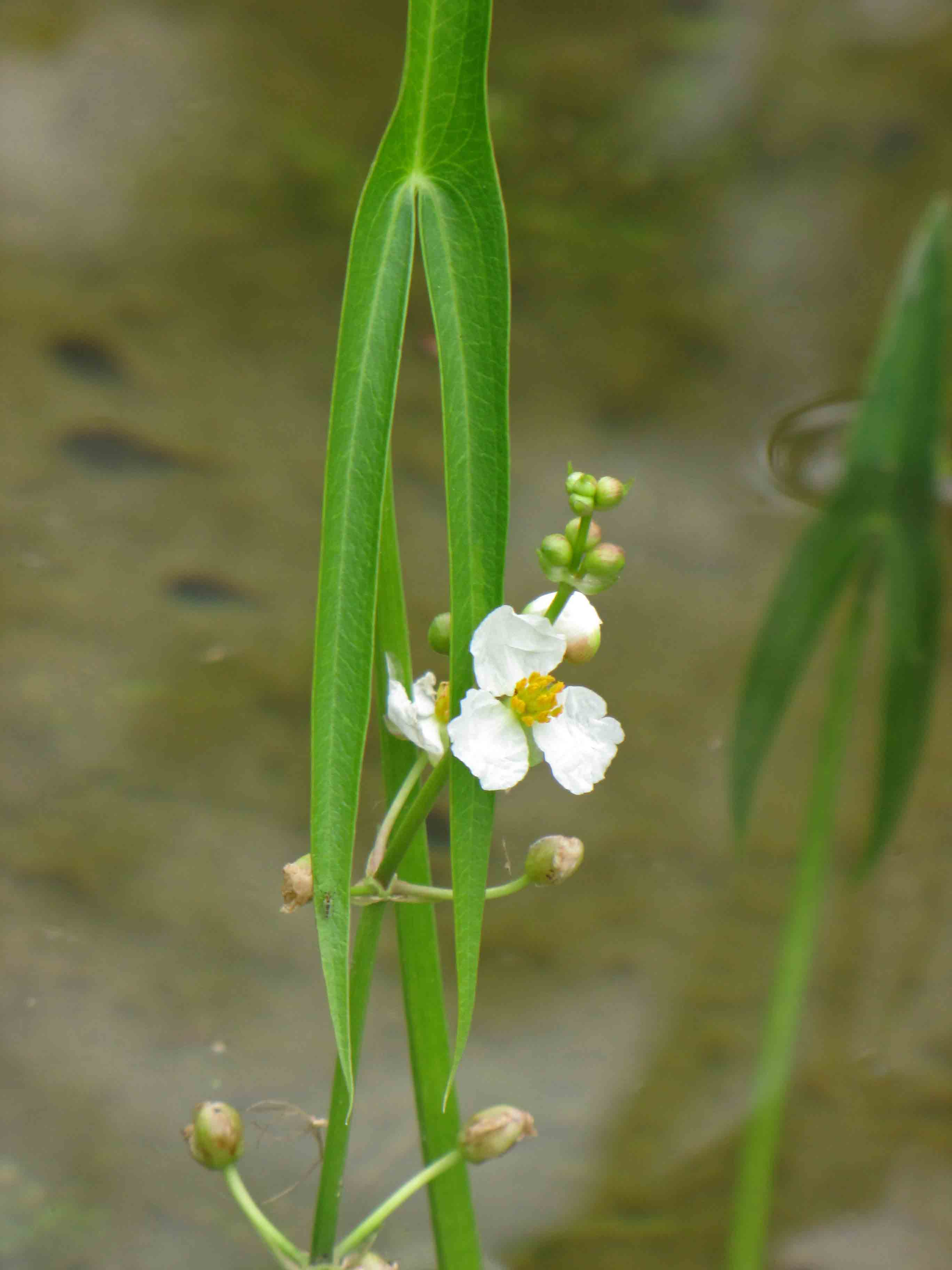

Scientific classification
- Kingdom: Plantae
- Clade: Embryophytes
- Clade: Tracheophytes
- Clade: Angiosperms
- Clade: Monocots
- Order: Alismatales
- Family: Alismataceae
- Genus: Sagittaria
- Species: S. trifolia

Binomial name
- Sagittaria trifolia L.

Synonyms
- Sagittaria sinensis Sims

= Sagittaria trifolia =

Species of flowering plant

Sagittaria trifolia, the threeleaf arrowhead or Chinese arrowhead, is a plant species widespread across the wet areas in Europe and in much of Asia.

== Distribution ==
S. trifolia is native to Ukraine, European Russia, Siberia, the Russian Far East, Central Asia, China, India, Iran, Iraq, Japan, Korea, Pakistan, Indonesia, the Philippines, and many smaller countries in between. It is also naturalized in the Fiji, Cook, and Society Islands in the Pacific.

== Uses ==
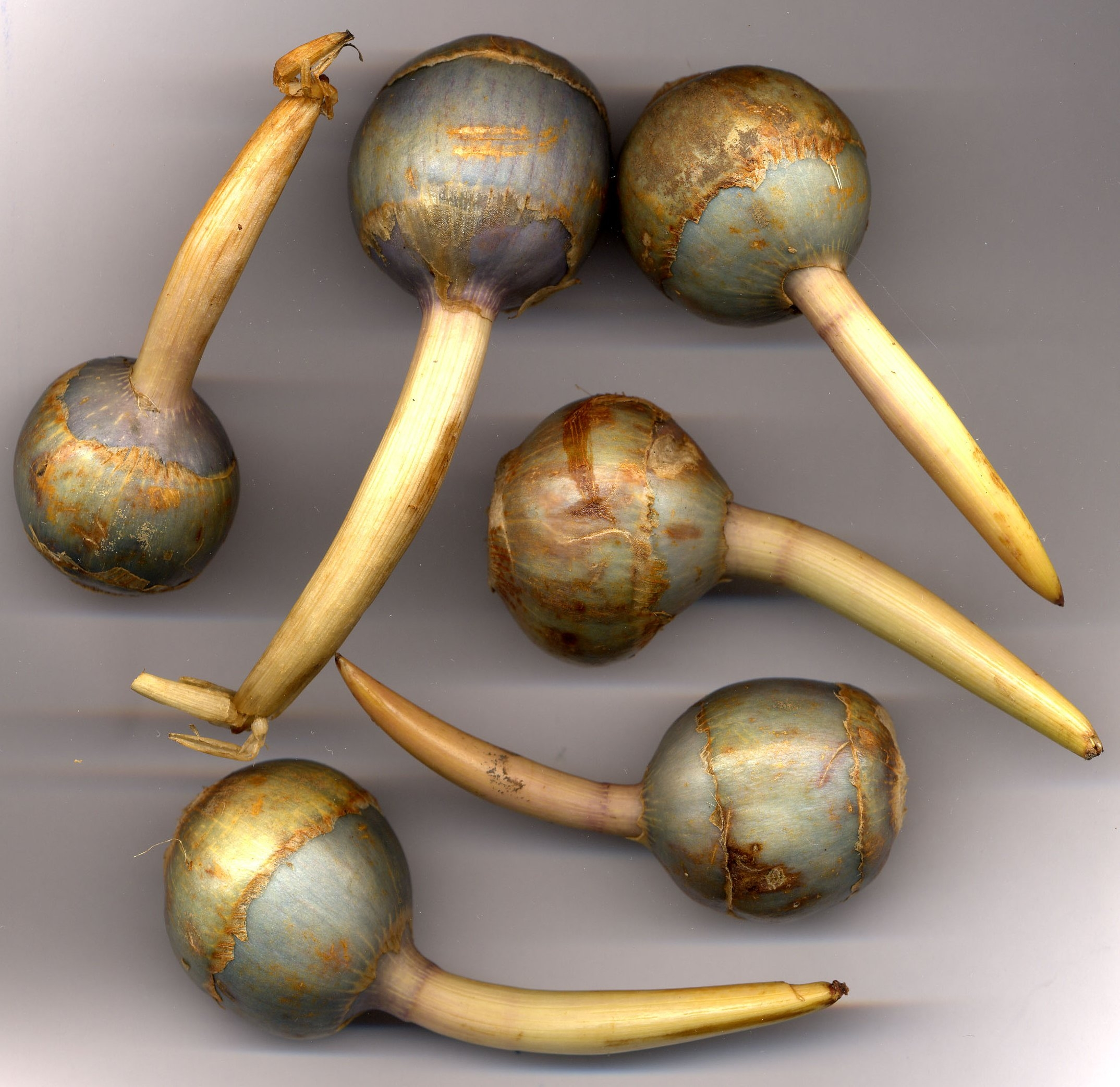
Edible S. trifolia bulbs

It has underground tubers and is cultivated as a food crop in parts of Asia. The tubers are high in starch and highly nutritious. One of these cultivars is used as kuwai in Japan.
