= Japanese pitch accent rules (non-common nouns) =

This article is an non-exhaustive list of rules that govern the Tokyo pitch accent of non-common nouns. For other rules, see Japanese pitch accent rules.

== Proper nouns ==
=== Given names ===
All bimoraic given names are initial accented, and some have different accent from the common nouns or verbs from which they derive:

- momo → Momo (桃; 'a peach → Momo'): /momo → mómo/
- hana → Hana (花; 'a flower → Hana'): /haná → hána/
- natsu → Natsu (夏; 'summer → Natsu'): /natsɯ́ → nátsɯ/
- haru → Haru (春; 'springtime → Haru'): /háɾɯ/
- chiyo → Chiyo (千代; 'a thousand years → Chiyo'): /cɕíjo/
- Miyo (美代): /míjo/
- Emi (恵美): /émi/
- ryū → Ryū (竜; 'a dragon → Ryū'): /ɾjɯ́R/
- Tetsu (哲): /tétsɯ/
- teru → Teru (照る; 'shines → Teru'): /téɾɯ/
- Takahama Kyoshi (高浜虚子): /takahama (|) kjóɕi ~ takáhama | kjóɕi/
- Kawai Sora (河合曾良): /kawai (|) sóɾa/
- Tokutomi Roka (徳富蘆花): /tokɯ̥tómi | ɾóka ~ tokɯ̥tomi ɾóka/
- Fujiwara no Sari ~ Fujiwara no Sukemasa (藤原佐理): /ɸɯʑiwaɾa no (|) sáɾi ~ ɸɯʑiwaɾa no (|) sɯ̥kémasa/
- Ibu (イブ; 'Eve'): /íbɯ/
- Jon (ジョン; 'John'): /ʑóN/

Most trimoraic names derived from common nouns or other types of names retain the original accent:

- iwao → Iwao (巌; 'a big rock → Iwao'): /iwao/
- makoto → Makoto (誠; 'sincerity → Makoto'): /makoto/
- kasumi → Kasumi (霞; 'mist → Kasumi'): /kasɯmi/
- sanae → Sanae (早苗; 'a rice seedling → Sanae'): /sanae/
- Yayoi (弥生; 'the third lunar month of the year → Yayoi'): /jajoi/
- tamaki → Tamaki (環; 'a beaded bracelet → Tamaki'): /támaki/
- midori → Midori (緑; 'green → Midori'): /mídoɾi/
- But: sakura → Sakura (桜; 'a cherry blossom → Sakura'): /sakɯɾa → sákɯɾa/

All trimoraic names derived from verbs are unaccented regardless of the verbs' original accent:

- kaoru → Kaoru (薫る→薫; 'is fragrant → Kaoru'): /kaoɾɯ/
- susumu → Susumu (進む→進; 'advances → Susumu'): /sɯsɯmɯ/
- isamu → Isamu (勇む→勇; 'is spirited → Isamu'): /isámɯ → isamɯ/
- osamu → Osamu (治む→治; 'governs → Osamu'): /osámɯ → osamɯ/
- tōru → Tōru (透る→透; 'penetrates → Tōru'): /tóRɾɯ → toRɾɯ/
- tamotsu → Tamotsu (保つ→保; 'preserves → Tamotsu'): /tamótsɯ → tamotsɯ/
- hajime → Hajime (初め→一; 'beginning → Hajime'): /haʑime/

All trimoraic names derived from adjectives and adjectival nouns are initial-accented:

- takeshi → Takeshi (猛し→猛; 'is brave → Takeshi'): /tákeɕi/
- tadashi → Tadashi (正し→正; 'is righteous → Tadashi'): /tadáɕi → tádaɕi/
- shizuka → Shizuka (静か→静; 'quiet → Shizuka'): /ɕízɯka/
- yutaka → Yutaka (豊か→豊; 'abundant → Yutaka'): /jɯ́taka/
- akiraka → Akira (明らか→明; 'bright → Akira'): /akíɾaka → ákiɾa/

Some feminine names often spelt only with kana are unaccented: Hiromi (ひろみ; /hiɾomi/), Naomi (なおみ; /naomi/), Masumi (ますみ; /masɯmi/), etc.

Foreign trimoraic names tend to be initial-accented: Jōji (ジョージ; /ʑóRʑi/ 'George'), Adamu (アダム; /ádamɯ/ 'Adam'), Marī (マリー; /máɾiR/ 'Marie'), Maria (マリア; /máɾia/ 'Mary ~ Maria'), Dante (ダンテ; /dáNte/ 'Dante'), Anne (アンネ; /áNne/ 'Anne', German: /ˈʔanə/), etc.

==== Given names with specific suffixes ====
Certain suffixes make names with predictable accent. An accent shift away from a voiceless mora is also possible.

- Unaccented:
  - ‑e (江・枝・恵): /kazɯe, ki̥kɯe, sɯmie, haɾɯe, ɸɯmie, masae, jɯkie/
  - ‑yo (代・世): /kazɯjo, haɾɯjo, masajo/
  - ‑o (夫・男・雄): /akio, kazɯo, kɯnio, takeo, teɾɯo, nobɯo, haɾɯo, hideo, ɸɯmio, masao, micɕio, jasɯo, jɯkio, joɕio/
  - ‑tomo (朝): Minamoto no Sanetomo (源実朝; /minamoto no (|) sanetomo/), Minamoto no Tametomo (源為朝; /minamoto no (|) tametomo/), Minamoto no Yoshitomo (源義朝; /minamoto no (|) joɕi̥tomo/), Minamoto no Yoritomo (源頼朝; /minamoto no (|) joɾitomo/), etc.
  - ‑ami (阿弥): Zeami → Zea (世阿弥→世阿; /zeami → zéa/), Kan'ami → Kan'a (観阿弥→観阿) /kaNami → káNa/, Sōami (相阿弥; /soRami/), Rakuami (楽阿弥; /ɾakɯami/), etc.
    - Kawatake Mokuami (河竹黙阿弥; /kawátake (|) mokɯami ~ kawatake (|) mokɯami ~ kawatake mokɯ́ami/), etc.
- Unaccented or penultimate-accented:
  - ‑zō (三・蔵・造): /jazoR ~ jazóR, tatsɯzoR ~ tatsɯzóR, wakazoR ~ wakazóR, koRzoR ~ koRzóR, ɕoRzoR ~ ɕoRzóR, maNzoR ~ maNzóR/
- Initial-accented:
  - ‑ka (香): (Note: Including the names derived from adjectival nouns mentioned above.) /ɸɯ́mika/
  - ‑ki (木・樹): /hídeki, másaki, jóɕi̥ki/
  - ‑to (人): /másato, jóɕi̥to/
  - ‑go (吾): /kéNɡo, ɡéNɡo, ɕóRɡo/
  - ‑ta (太): /kéNta, sáNta, ɕóRta, zéNta/
- Unaccented or initial-accented:
  - ‑ya (也・弥・哉): /kɯRja, cɕɯRja, bɯNja, ɾikija, kazɯja ~ kázɯja, masaja ~ másaja, naoja ~ náoja, tákɯja, tátsɯja/
- (Pre)antepenultimate-accented:
  - ‑nojō (之丞): /jɯkinóʑoR, ki̥kɯnóʑoR/
  - ‑bē (兵衛): Gengobē (源五兵衛; /ɡeNɡóbeR/), Saburobē (三郎兵衛; /sabɯɾóbeR/), etc.
    - Yamamoto Gonbē (山本権兵衛; /jamamoto (|) ɡóNbeR/), Umegawa Chūbē (梅川忠兵衛; /ɯmeɡawa (|) cɕɯ́RbeR → Nmeɡawa (|) cɕɯ́RbeR/), etc.
    - But: Gotō Matabē (後藤又兵衛; /ɡotoR (|) mátabeR/)
  - ‑sai (斎): Rokumusai (六無斎; /ɾokɯmɯ́sai/), Kansai (寛斎; /káNsai/), Ichiryūsai (一竜斎; /icɕiɾjɯ́Rsai/), etc.
    - Yamazaki Ansai (山崎闇斎; /jamázaki | áNsai/), Hosokawa Yūsai (細川幽斎; /hosókawa | jɯ́Rsai ~ hosokawa (|) jɯ́Rsai/), Itō Ittōsai (伊藤一刀斎; /itoR (|) iQtóRsai/), Tomioka Tessai (富岡鉄斎; /tomíoka | téQsai ~ tomioka téQsai ~ tomíoka (|) teQsai/), etc.
    - But: Katsushika Hokusai (葛飾北斎; /katsɯ́ɕi̥ka | hókɯ̥sai ~ katsɯ̥ɕi̥ka hókɯ̥sai ~ katsɯ́ɕi̥ka (|) hokɯ̥sai ~ katsɯ́ɕi̥ka | hokɯ̥sái/), etc.

A name's accent may also correlate with the mora count of the component preceding its suffix.

- ‑ko (子), ‑ji (二・治・次):
  - Bimoraic: Initial-accented: /áki̥ko, íkɯ̥ko, éiko, étsɯ̥ko, kázɯko, kíjoko, kɯ́niko, kéiko, sácɕi̥ko, ʑɯ́Nko, sɯ́miko, tákeko, cɕíeko, téɾɯko, tómiko, nátsɯ̥ko, nóbɯko, hánako, háɾɯko, hídeko, híɾoko, ɸɯ́miko, míeko, mícɕi̥ko, jásɯ̥ko, jɯ́ki̥ko, jɯ́ɾiko, jóRko, jóɕi̥ko, ɾáNko, kí̥kɯko → ki̥kɯ́ko, hí̥sako → hi̥sáko, ɸɯ̥́sako → ɸɯ̥sáko, kéNʑi, ɕóRʑi, jɯ́meʑi/
  - Trimoraic: (Ante)penultimate-accented: /kaedéko, sakɯɾáko, midoɾíko, sadáNʑi/
- ‑kichi (吉), ‑shichi (七), ‑hachi/‑pachi (八), ‑saku (作):
  - Unimoraic: Unaccented: /saki̥cɕi, moki̥cɕi, ɾiki̥cɕi, saɕi̥cɕi, jahacɕi, josakɯ/
  - Bimoraic: Unaccented, final- or penultimate-accented: /saNki̥cɕi ~ saNki̥cɕí ~ saNkí̥cɕi, ɕoRki̥cɕi ~ ɕoRki̥cɕí ~ ɕoRkí̥cɕi, jasɯki̥cɕi ~ jasɯki̥cɕí ~ jasɯkí̥cɕi, ɕiNɕi̥cɕi ~ ɕiNɕi̥cɕí ~ ɕiNɕí̥cɕi, haNɕi̥cɕi ~ haNɕi̥cɕí ~ haNɕí̥cɕi, matahacɕi ~ matahacɕí ~ matahácɕi, daihacɕi ~ daihacɕí ~ daihácɕi, ɡoNpacɕi ~ ɡoNpacɕí ~ ɡoNpácɕi, ɕiNsakɯ ~ ɕiNsakɯ́ ~ ɕiNsákɯ/
- ‑ichi (一・市):
  - Unimoraic: Initial-accented: /táicɕi, jáicɕi, jóicɕi, ɾíicɕi/
  - Bimoraic: Unaccented, final- or penultimate-accented: /kaNicɕi ~ kaNicɕí ~ kaNícɕi, ɕoRicɕi ~ ɕoRicɕí ~ ɕoRícɕi, ɕiNicɕi ~ ɕiNicɕí ~ ɕiNícɕi/
- ‑rō (郎):
  - Unimoraic: Initial-accented: /táɾoR, ʑíɾoR, ɕíɾoR, ɡóɾoR, kɯ́ɾoR/
  - Bimoraic: Unaccented or final-accented: /icɕiɾoR ~ icɕiɾóR, sabɯɾoR ~ sabɯɾóR, ɾokɯɾoR ~ ɾokɯɾóR, ɕi̥cɕiɾoR ~ ɕi̥cɕiɾóR, hacɕiɾoR ~ hacɕiɾóR, ʑɯRɾoR ~ ʑɯRɾóR/
- ‑suke (助・介・輔):
  - Unimoraic: Unaccented: /ɡosɯ̥ke, sasɯ̥ke, tasɯ̥ke, jasɯ̥ke/
  - Bimoraic or longer: Antepenultimate-accented: /imásɯ̥ke, takásɯ̥ke, nebósɯ̥ke, wabísɯ̥ke, ɸɯkɯ́sɯ̥ke, kóRsɯ̥ke, kjóRsɯ̥ke, ɕóRsɯ̥ke, sabɯɾóRsɯ̥ke, káNsɯ̥ke, sáNsɯ̥ke, déNsɯ̥ke, dáisɯ̥ke/
- ‑nosuke (之助・之介・之輔):
  - Bimoraic or shorter: Unaccented: /tanosɯ̥ke, jonosɯ̥ke, ɾjɯRnosɯ̥ke/
  - Trimoraic or longer: Antepenultimate-accented: /ɯɾaminósɯ̥ke, koRzɯkenósɯ̥ke/
- ‑hei/‑hē/‑pei (平・兵衛):
  - Unimoraic: Initial-accented: /ɡóheR, táheR, jóheR, ɾíheR/
  - Bimoraic: Unaccented: /joɕiheR, ɾjoRheR, kaNpeR, saNpeR/
- ‑maru (丸), ‑maro (麻呂→麿):
  - Bimoraic or shorter: Unaccented: Kikumaru (菊丸; /ki̥kɯmaɾɯ/), Semimaru (蝉丸; /semimaɾɯ/), etc.
    - Mori Ranmaru (森蘭丸; /moɾi (|) ɾaNmaɾɯ/), Kitagawa Utamaro (喜多川歌麿; /ki̥taɡawa (|) ɯtamaɾo/), Toki Zenmaro (土岐善麿; /toki (|) zeNmaɾo/), Kakinomoto no Hitomaro (柿本人麻呂; /kakinómoto no (|) hi̥tomaɾo/), etc.
  - Trimoraic or longer: Antepenultimate-accented: Hikawamaru (氷川丸; /hi̥kawámaɾɯ/), etc.
    - Toyotomi Hiyoshimaru (豊臣日吉丸; /tojotomi (|) hijoɕímaɾɯ/), Minamoto no Ushiwakamaru (源牛若丸; /minamoto no (|) ɯɕiwakámaɾɯ/), Sakanoue no Tamuramaro (坂上田村麻呂; /sakanóɯe no | tamɯɾámaɾo/), etc.
- ‑emon (右衛門), ‑zaemon (左衛門):
  - Unimoraic: Unaccented: Yoemon (与右衛門; /joemoN/), Dozaemon (土左衛門; /dozaemoN/), etc.
    - Ishikawa Goemon (石川五右衛門; /iɕi̥kawa (|) ɡoemoN/), etc.
  - Bimoraic with an autonomous second beat: Unaccented or accented on the suffix's first mora: Kichiemon (吉右衛門; /ki̥cɕiemoN ~ ki̥cɕiémoN/), Hikozaemon (彦左衛門; /hi̥kozaemoN ~ hi̥kozáemoN/), etc.
  - Bimoraic with a special second beat: Initial-accented or accented on the suffix's first mora: Kan'emon (勘右衛門; /káNemoN ~ kaNémoN/), Heiemon (平右衛門; /héiemoN ~ heiémoN/), Tōzaemon (藤左衛門; /tóRzaemoN ~ toRzáemoN/), etc.
    - Ōtani Tomoemon (大谷友右衛門; /óRtani (|) tomoemoN ~ óRtani | tomoémoN/), Ido Heizaemon (井戸平左衛門; /ído | héizaemoN ~ ído | heizáemoN/), Chikamatsu Monzaemon (近松門左衛門; /cɕi̥kámatsɯ | moNzáemoN ~ cɕi̥kamatsɯ moNzáemoN ~ cɕi̥kámatsɯ | móNzaemoN/), etc.
  - Trimoraic or longer: Accented on the suffix's first mora: Kurōemon (九郎右衛門; /kɯɾoRémoN/), Tarōzaemon (太郎左衛門; /taɾoRzáemoN/), etc.
- ‑tayū/‑dayū (太夫・大夫):
  - Unimoraic, or bimoraic with an autonomous second beat: Unaccented: Tsunatayū (綱大夫; /tsɯnatajɯR/), Tsudayū (津大夫; /tsɯdajɯR/), Gidayū (義太夫; /ɡidajɯR/), Kudayū (九太夫; /kɯdajɯR/), etc.
    - Tokiwazu Mojitayū (常磐津文字太夫; /tokiwazɯ (|) moʑitajɯR/), etc.
  - Bimoraic with a special second beat: Initial-accented or accented on the suffix's first mora: Sandayū (三太夫; /sáNdajɯR ~ saNdájɯR/), etc.
  - Trimoraic or longer: Accented on the suffix's first mora: Sanshōdayū (山椒太夫; /saNɕoRdájɯR/), etc.
    - Kiyomoto Enjudayū (清元延寿太夫; /kijómoto | eNʑɯdájɯR/), etc.

===== Extended ‑rō given names =====
A name with the suffix ‑rō (郎), as the second component of a compound, can be further expanded regularly. If the second component is trimoraic, the name's accent correlates with both components. If the second component is quadrimoraic, it alone determines the accent.

Second component First component	Tarō (太郎; /táɾoR/) Shirō (四郎; /ɕíɾoR/) Kurō (九郎; /kɯ́ɾoR/)	Jirō (二郎・次郎; /ʑíɾoR/)	Gorō (五郎; /ɡóɾoR/)	Jūrō (十郎; /ʑɯRɾoR ~ ʑɯRɾóR/)	Kichirō (吉郎; /ki̥cɕiɾoR ~ ki̥cɕiɾóR/) Ichirō (一郎; /icɕiɾoR ~ icɕiɾóR/) Shichirō (七郎; /ɕi̥cɕiɾoR ~ ɕi̥cɕiɾóR/) Hachirō (八郎; /hacɕiɾoR ~ hacɕiɾóR/) Rokurō (六郎; /ɾokɯɾoR ~ ɾokɯɾóR/)	Saburō (三郎; /sabɯɾoR ~ sabɯɾóR/)	‑zaburō (三郎)
Unimoraic	/jotaɾoR, joɕiɾoR/	/jaʑiɾoR, joʑiɾoR/	/koɡoɾoR, joɡoɾoR/	/daNʑɯRɾoR, seiʑɯRɾoR ~ seRʑɯRɾoR, tomiʑɯRɾoR/	/toRki̥cɕíɾoR ~ toRkí̥cɕiɾoR, ʑɯNicɕíɾoR ~ ʑɯNícɕiɾoR, heihacɕíɾoR ~ heRhacɕíɾoR ~ heihácɕiɾoR ~ heRhácɕiɾoR/	/kosábɯɾoR, josábɯɾoR, maɡosábɯɾoR, ɕibasábɯɾoR/	/kaNzabɯɾoR, ɡeNzabɯɾoR, ɾjɯRzabɯɾoR, daizabɯɾoR/
Bimoraic, 2nd mora being /N/	/kiNtaɾoR, saNɕiɾoR, ɡeNkɯɾoR/	/ɡáNʑiɾoR, kíNʑiɾoR/	/ɡeNɡoɾoR, saNɡoɾoR/	/daNʑɯRɾoR, seiʑɯRɾoR ~ seRʑɯRɾoR, tomiʑɯRɾoR/	/toRki̥cɕíɾoR ~ toRkí̥cɕiɾoR, ʑɯNicɕíɾoR ~ ʑɯNícɕiɾoR, heihacɕíɾoR ~ heRhacɕíɾoR ~ heihácɕiɾoR ~ heRhácɕiɾoR/	/kosábɯɾoR, josábɯɾoR, maɡosábɯɾoR, ɕibasábɯɾoR/	/kaNzabɯɾoR, ɡeNzabɯɾoR, ɾjɯRzabɯɾoR, daizabɯɾoR/
Bimoraic, 2nd mora being /R/	/koRtaɾoR, koRɕiɾoR, toRkɯɾoR/	/jɯ́RʑiɾoR, jóRʑiɾoR/	/sóRɡoɾoR, ɕóRɡoɾoR/	/daNʑɯRɾoR, seiʑɯRɾoR ~ seRʑɯRɾoR, tomiʑɯRɾoR/	/toRki̥cɕíɾoR ~ toRkí̥cɕiɾoR, ʑɯNicɕíɾoR ~ ʑɯNícɕiɾoR, heihacɕíɾoR ~ heRhacɕíɾoR ~ heihácɕiɾoR ~ heRhácɕiɾoR/	/kosábɯɾoR, josábɯɾoR, maɡosábɯɾoR, ɕibasábɯɾoR/	/kaNzabɯɾoR, ɡeNzabɯɾoR, ɾjɯRzabɯɾoR, daizabɯɾoR/
Bimoraic, 2nd mora being /i/	/keitaɾoR → keRtaɾoR, heikɯɾoR → heRkɯɾoR/		/éiɡoɾoR → éRɡoɾoR, dáiɡoɾoR/	/daNʑɯRɾoR, seiʑɯRɾoR ~ seRʑɯRɾoR, tomiʑɯRɾoR/	/toRki̥cɕíɾoR ~ toRkí̥cɕiɾoR, ʑɯNicɕíɾoR ~ ʑɯNícɕiɾoR, heihacɕíɾoR ~ heRhacɕíɾoR ~ heihácɕiɾoR ~ heRhácɕiɾoR/	/kosábɯɾoR, josábɯɾoR, maɡosábɯɾoR, ɕibasábɯɾoR/	/kaNzabɯɾoR, ɡeNzabɯɾoR, ɾjɯRzabɯɾoR, daizabɯɾoR/
Bimoraic, 2nd mora being anything else	/momótaɾoR, sadákɯɾoR/	/otóʑiɾoR, masáʑiɾoR/	/hacɕíɡoɾoR, mɯtsɯ́ɡoɾoR/	/daNʑɯRɾoR, seiʑɯRɾoR ~ seRʑɯRɾoR, tomiʑɯRɾoR/	/toRki̥cɕíɾoR ~ toRkí̥cɕiɾoR, ʑɯNicɕíɾoR ~ ʑɯNícɕiɾoR, heihacɕíɾoR ~ heRhacɕíɾoR ~ heihácɕiɾoR ~ heRhácɕiɾoR/	/kosábɯɾoR, josábɯɾoR, maɡosábɯɾoR, ɕibasábɯɾoR/	/kaNzabɯɾoR, ɡeNzabɯɾoR, ɾjɯRzabɯɾoR, daizabɯɾoR/

Some kabuki performers' stage names are exceptional: Onoe Kikugorō (尾上菊五郎; /onoe (|) ki̥kɯɡoɾoR/), Ichikawa Somegorō (市川染五郎; /icɕi̥káwa (|) someɡoɾoR/), Bandō Mitsugorō (坂東三津五郎; /báNdoR (|) mitsɯɡoɾoR ~ baNdoR (|) mitsɯɡoɾoR/), etc.

==== Historical given names with no specific suffixes ====
The native names of historical figures tend to follow the antepenultimate rule. Some more accentually established names are unaccented, but some of them have become regularized as antepenultimate-accented:

- Oda Nobunaga (織田信長; /oda (|) nobɯ́naɡa ~ oda (|) nobɯnaɡa/), Toyotomi Hideyoshi (豊臣秀吉; /tojotomi (|) hidéjoɕi ~ tojotomi (|) hidejoɕi/), etc.
- Tokugawa Ieyasu (徳川家康; /tokɯ́ɡawa | iéjasɯ ~ tokɯɡawa iéjasɯ ~ tokɯ́ɡawa (|) iejasɯ/), Motoori Norinaga (本居宣長; /motóoɾi | noɾínaɡa ~ motooɾi noɾínaɡa ~ motóoɾi (|) noɾinaɡa/), Andō Hiroshige (安藤広重; /áNdoR | hiɾóɕiɡe ~ áNdoR (|) hiɾoɕiɡe/), etc.
- Ueda Akinari (上田秋成; /ɯeda (|) akínaɾi/), Kimura Shigenari (木村重成; /kimɯɾa (|) ɕiɡénaɾi/), Hōjō Tokimasa (北条時政; /hoRʑoR (|) tokímasa/), Sasaki Nobutsuna (佐佐木信綱; /sasaki (|) nobɯ́tsɯna/), Itō Hirobumi (伊藤博文; /itoR (|) hiɾóbɯmi/), Ariwara no Narihira (在原業平; /aɾiwaɾa no (|) naɾíhiɾa/), Fujiwara no Hidehira (藤原秀衡; /ɸɯʑiwaɾa no (|) hidéhiɾa/), Minamoto no Yoshiie (源義家; /minamoto no (|) joɕíie/), Kawakami Sadayakko (川上貞奴; /kawakami (|) sadajáQko/), Hanawa Hokinoichi ~ Hanawa Hokiichi (塙保己一; /hanawa (|) hokinóicɕi ~ hanawa (|) hokíicɕi/), etc.
- Kamo no Mabuchi (賀茂真淵; /kámo no | mábɯcɕi ~ kamo no mábɯcɕi/), Saigō Takamori (西郷隆盛; /sáiɡoR | takámoɾi ~ saiɡoR takámoɾi/), Tokugawa Yoshinobu (徳川慶喜; /tokɯ́ɡawa | joɕínobɯ ~ tokɯɡawa joɕínobɯ ~ tokɯ́ɡawa | kéiki/), Ki no Tsurayuki (紀貫之; /kí no | tsɯɾájɯki ~ ki no tsɯɾájɯki/), etc.
- Taira no Kiyomori (平清盛; /táiɾa no | kijómoɾi/), Okazaki Masamune (岡崎正宗; /okázaki | masámɯne/), Shimazu Nariakira (島津斉彬; /ɕímazɯ | naɾiákiɾa/), Katō Yoshiakira (加藤嘉明; /kátoR | joɕiákiɾa/), etc.
- But: Katō Kiyomasa (加藤清正; /kátoR (|) kijomasa/), Kusunoki Masashige (楠木正成; /kɯ̥sɯ́noki (|) masaɕiɡe/), Kusunoki Masatsura (楠木正行; /kɯ̥sɯ́noki (|) masatsɯɾa/), Taira no Masakado (平将門; /táiɾa no (|) masakado/), etc.

Fully or partly Sino-Japanese names also tend to follow the antepenultimate rule, and are simultaneously initial-accented in many cases. Some more accentually established names are unaccented, final- or penultimate-accented, but some of them have become regularized as antepenultimate-accented:

- Maruyama Ōkyo (円山応挙; /maɾɯjama (|) óRkjo ~ maɾɯjama (|) oRkjo/), Shikitei Sanba (式亭三馬; /ɕi̥kitei (|) saNba ~ ɕi̥kitei (|) sáNba/), Fujiwara no Teika ~ Fujiwara no Sadaie (藤原定家; /ɸɯʑiwaɾɑ no (|) téika ~ ɸɯʑiwaɾɑ no (|) teika ~ ɸɯʑiwaɾɑ no (|) sadáie/), etc.
- Jippensha Ikku ~ Juppensha Ikku (十返舎一九; /ʑiQpéNɕa | íQkɯ ~ ʑiQpeNɕa íQkɯ ~ ʑiQpéNɕa (|) iQkɯ ~ ʑɯQpéNɕa | íQkɯ ~ ʑɯQpeNɕa íQkɯ/), Sen no Rikyū (千利休; /séN no | ɾíkjɯR ~ seN no ɾíkjɯR ~ séN no (|) ɾikjɯR/), etc.
- Tsubouchi Shōyō (坪内逍遥; /tsɯbóɯcɕi | ɕóRjoR ~ tsɯboɯcɕi̥ ɕóRjoR ~ tsɯbóɯcɕi (|) ɕoRjoR/), Yokoyama Taikan (横山大観; /jokójama | táikaN ~ jokojama táikaN ~ jokójama (|) taikaN/), etc.
- Matsunaga Teitoku (松永貞徳; /matsɯ́naɡa | téitokɯ ~ matsɯ́naɡa (|) teitokɯ/), etc.
- Gyōki (行基; /ɡjóRki/), Nichiren (日蓮; /nicɕíɾeN ~ nícɕiɾeN/), etc.
- Ingen (隠元; /íNɡeN/), Unkei (運慶; /ɯ́Nkei/), Eisai ~ Yōsai (栄西; /éisai ~ jóRsai/), Keichū (契沖; /kéicɕɯR/), Kūkai (空海; /kɯ́Rkai/), Shunkan (俊寛; /ɕɯ́NkaN/), Shinran (親鸞; /ɕíNɾaN/), Sesshū (雪舟; /séQɕɯR/), Dōgen (道元; /dóRɡeN/), Hōnen (法然; /hóRneN/), Ryōkan (良寛; /ɾjóRkaN/), Ganjin (鑑真; /ɡáNʑiN/ 'Jianzhen'), etc.
- Ogyū Sorai (荻生徂徠; /oɡjɯR (|) sóɾai/), Kawabata Ryūshi (川端竜子; /kawabata (|) ɾjɯ́Rɕi/), Kōda Rohan (幸田露伴; /koRda (|) ɾóhaN/), etc.
- Mori Ōgai (森鴎外; /moɾi (|) óRɡai/), Fujiwara no Shunzei ~ Fujiwara no Toshinari (藤原俊成; /ɸɯʑiwaɾa no (|) ɕɯ́Nzei ~ ɸɯʑiwaɾa no (|) toɕínaɾi/), etc.
- Nagai Kafū (永井荷風; /náɡai | káɸɯR ~ naɡai káɸɯR/), Izumi Kyōka (泉鏡花; /ízɯmi | kjóRka ~ izɯmi kjóRka/), etc.
- Ihara Saikaku (井原西鶴; /íhaɾa | sáikakɯ ~ ihaɾa sáikakɯ/), etc.
- Tōshūsai Sharaku (東洲斎写楽; /toRɕɯ́Rsai | ɕáɾakɯ/), Tokutomi Sohō (徳富蘇峰; /tokɯ̥tómi | sóhoR/), Yosa Buson; Taniguchi Buson (与謝蕪村・谷口蕪村; /jósa | bɯ́soN; taníɡɯcɕi | bɯ́soN/), etc.
- Katsu Kaishū (勝海舟; /kátsɯ | káiɕɯR/), Nishiyama Sōin (西山宗因; /niɕijama (|) sóRiN/), Shimazaki Tōson (島崎藤村; /ɕimázaki | tóRsoN/), Musashibō Benkei (武蔵坊弁慶; /mɯsaɕíboR | béNkei/), Sakata no Kintoki (坂田金時・坂田公時; /sákata no | kíNtoki/), etc.
- But:
  - Wakayama Bokusui (若山牧水; /wakájama | bókɯ̥sɯi ~ wakajama bókɯ̥sɯi ~ wakájama (|) bokɯ̥sɯi/)
  - Kisen (喜撰; /ki̥seN/), Takizawa Bakin (滝沢馬琴; /takizawa (|) bakiN/), Kawabata Gyokushō (川端玉章; /kawabata (|) ɡjokɯ̥ɕoR/), etc.
  - San'yūtei Enshō (三遊亭円生; /saNjɯtei (|) eNɕóR/), San'yūtei Enchō (三遊亭円朝; /saNjɯtei (|) eNcɕóR/), Kokontei Shinshō (古今亭志ん生; /kokoNtei (|) ɕiNɕóR/), Onoe Baikō (尾上梅幸; /onoe (|) baikóR/), etc.

=== Family names ===
Most trimoraic or shorter family names are initial-accented, and some may have different accent from the common nouns they derive from:

- oka → Oka (岡; 'a hill → Oka'): /oka → óka/
- taki → Taki (滝; 'a waterfall → Taki'): /taki → táki/
- nishi → Nishi (西; 'west → Nishi'): /niɕi → níɕi/
- minami → Minami (南; 'south → Minami'): /minami → mínami/
- shima → Shima (島; 'an island → Shima'): /ɕimá → ɕíma/
- higashi → Higashi (東; 'east → Higashi'): /hiɡaɕi ~ hiɡaɕí → híɡaɕi/
- Azuma (東; 'Kantō → Azuma'): /ázɯma/
- hara → Hara (原; 'a plain → Hara'): /háɾa/
- Ri (李; 'Lee'): /ɾí/
- Ī (イー; 'Lee', Korean: /i/): /íR/
- Ō (王; 'Wang'): /óR/
- Kin (金; 'Jin'): /kíN/
- Kimu (キム; 'Kim', Korean: /kim/): /kímɯ/
- Chin (陳; 'Chen'): /cɕíN/
- But:
  - ogawa → Ogawa (小川; 'a stream → Ogawa'): /oɡawa/
  - kubo → Kubo (窪・久保; 'a hollow → Kubo'): /kɯbo ~ kɯ́bo/
  - kido → Kido (木戸; 'a gate → Kido'): /kído → kído ~ kido/
  - shiba → Shiba (芝; 'a lawn → Shiba'): /ɕiba → ɕiba ~ ɕíba/
  - date → Date (伊達; 'elegance → Date'): /date ~ daté → date/
  - tsuji → Tsuji (辻; 'an intersection → Tsuji'): /tsɯʑi/
  - baba → Baba (馬場; 'a racecourse → Baba'): /bába ~ baba → baba/
  - hori → Hori (堀; 'a moat → Hori'): /hoɾí → hoɾi ~ hóɾi/
  - mori → Mori (森; 'a forest → Mori'): /moɾi → moɾi ~ móɾi/
  - hayashi → Hayashi (林; 'a grove → Hayashi'): /hajaɕi ~ hajaɕí → hajaɕi/

Western names generally follow the antepenultimate rule: Shō (ショー; /ɕóR/ 'Shaw'), Sumisu (スミス; /sɯ́misɯ/ 'Smith'), Dāwin (ダーウィン; /dáRwiN/ 'Darwin'), Nyūton (ニュートン; /njɯ́RtoN/ 'Newton'), Chāchiru (チャーチル; /cɕáRcɕiɾɯ/ 'Churchill'), Gēte (ゲーテ; /ɡéRte/ 'Goethe'), Bahha (バッハ; /báQha/ 'Bach'), Menderu (メンデル; /méNdeɾɯ/ 'Mendel'), Gohho (ゴッホ; /ɡóQho/ 'Goch'), Shopan (ショパン; /ɕópaN/ 'Chopin'), Rusō (ルソー; /ɾɯ́soR/ 'Rousseau'), Kyūrī (キューリー; /kjɯ́RɾiR/ 'Curie'), Dekaruto (デカルト; /dekáɾɯto/ 'Descartes'), do Gōru (ドゴール; /do ɡóRɾɯ/ 'de Gaulle'), Ganjī (ガンジー; /ɡáNʑiR/ 'Gandhi'), etc.

- Although a few retain the accent in the source languages:
  - English: Edison /ˈɛdɪsən/ → Ejison (エジソン) /éʑisoN/
  - German:
    - Marx /maʁks/ → Marukusu (マルクス) /máɾɯkɯ̥sɯ/
    - Schubert /ˈʃuːbəʁt/ → Shūberuto (シューベルト) /ɕɯ́Rbeɾɯto ~ ɕɯRbéɾɯto/
  - French: Sartre /saʁtʁ(ə)/ → Sarutoru (サルトル) /sáɾɯtoɾɯ/

==== Family names with specific suffixes ====
Family names with specific suffixes are generally predictable.

- Unaccented:
  - ‑ga (賀・我): /koɡa, ɕiɡa, haɡa, soɡa/
  - ‑da (田): /oda, sada, sɯda, tsɯda, toda, wada, iRda, ikeda, iɕida, ɯeda, ɯcɕida, okada, okɯda, kaNda, koRda, sanada, ɕimoda, takeda, tsɯ̥cɕida, nakada, ɸɯ̥kɯda, hoNda, maeda, masɯda, matsɯda, jasɯda, jamada, joɕida/
    - But: /háɾada, kɯ́ɾoda/
  - ‑zawa (沢): /ozawa, tazawa, jɯzawa, takizawa, nakazawa, ɸɯ̥kɯzawa/
  - ‑shima/‑jima (島): /ki̥ɕima, miɕima, koʑima, oRɕima, kawaɕima, kɯɾaɕima, tsɯ̥kiɕima, nakaʑima/
  - ‑moto (本): /iwamoto, okamoto, kawamoto, sakamoto, haɕimoto, matsɯmoto, mijamoto, jamamoto/
    - But: /sɯɡímoto, joɕímoto/
- (Pre)antepenultimate-accented:
  - ‑uchi (内): /takéɯcɕi, matsɯ́ɯcɕi, mijáɯcɕi/
  - ‑nouchi (内), ‑noike (池), etc: /takenóɯcɕi, jamanóɯcɕi, koRnóike/
  - ‑kawa (川): /jɯ́kawa, kɯɾókawa, tsɯɾɯ́kawa, hanákawa, ɸɯɾɯ́kawa, hosókawa, jamákawa, icɕí̥kawa → icɕi̥káwa, tacɕí̥kawa → tacɕi̥káwa, joɕí̥kawa → joɕi̥káwa, niɕi̥káwa, jasɯ̥káwa, natsɯ̥káwa, kiQkáwa/
    - But: /asakawa, aɾakawa, iɕi̥kawa/
  - ‑guchi (口): /táɡɯcɕi, nóɡɯcɕi, híɡɯcɕi, kawáɡɯcɕi, sekíɡɯcɕi, jamáɡɯcɕi/
  - ‑saki/‑zaki (崎): /ésaki, ózaki, tázaki, jázaki, iwásaki, okázaki, tanízaki, jamázaki/
  - ‑shita (下): /sɯɡíɕi̥ta, matsɯ́ɕi̥ta, jamáɕi̥ta/
  - ‑naga (永): /tomínaɡa, matsɯ́naɡa, moɾínaɡa/
  - ‑hashi (橋): /kɯɾáhaɕi, takáhaɕi, matsɯ́haɕi/
  - ‑hara/‑bara (原): /ɯéhaɾa, nakáhaɾa, matsɯ́baɾa/
  - ‑mori (森): /sɯɡímoɾi, takémoɾi, ɸɯʑímoɾi/

A name's accent may also correlate with the mora count of the component preceding its suffix.

- ‑ta (田), ‑no (野):
  - Unimoraic: Unaccented: /mita, ɯno, ono, sano, seno, hino, mano, jano/
  - Bimoraic: Initial-accented: /áki̥ta, íkɯ̥ta, kɯ́bota, sákata, ɕíbata, táki̥ta, tómita, ɸɯ́ʑita, mízɯta, móɾita, ɯ́eno, óRno, náɡano, híɾano, mákino, móɾino, jóɕino/
    - But: /oRta, naɡata, mɯɾata, asano/
- ‑i (井), ‑ki/‑gi (木):
  - Unimoraic: Initial-accented: /íi, tái, jɯ́i, séki, máki, míki, nóɡi/
  - Bimoraic: Unaccented: /asai, aɾai, iɕii, imai, kawai, takei, ɸɯʑii, matsɯi, jasɯi, aoki, sasaki, sɯzɯki, namiki, matsɯ̥ki, takaɡi/
    - But: /sákai, náɡai, mítsɯi, áɾaki, ɯ́eki/
- ‑kami/‑gami (上), ‑gawa (川), ‑yama (山):
  - Unimoraic: Initial-accented: /míkami, néɡami, nóɡami, áɡawa, tóɡawa, nóɡawa, kíjama, kójama, sájama/
    - But: /oɡawa/
  - Bimoraic: Unaccented: /kawakami, mɯɾakami, jamaɡami, akaɡawa, ki̥taɡawa, sasaɡawa, ɕinaɡawa, takiɡawa, haseɡawa, mijaɡawa, janaɡawa, iɕijama, ɯcɕijama, oRjama, katajama, sɯɡijama, takajama, toRjama, nakajama, haɾɯjama, maɾɯjama/
    - But: /tokɯ́ɡawa, nakáɡawa, akíjama, jokójama/

===== Long compound family names =====
Long compound family names tend to follow the rules of long modifier–head compound nouns.

- akuta + kawa → Akutagawa (芥+川→芥川; 'rubbish + a river → Akutagawa'): /akɯ̥ta ~ ákɯ̥ta + kawá → akɯtá-ɡawa/
- sakaki + hara → Sakakibara (榊+原→榊原; 'sakaki + a plain → Sakakibara'): /sakaki + háɾa → sakakí-baɾa/
- waka + hayashi → Wakabayashi (若+林→若林; 'young + a grove → Wakabayashi'): /wáka + hajaɕi ~ hajaɕí → waka-bájaɕi/
- matsu + taira → Matsudaira (松+平→松平; 'pine + flat → Matsudaira'): /mátsɯ + táiɾa → matsɯ-dáiɾa ~ mátsɯ-daiɾa/

=== Full names and dvandvas ===
==== Japanese names ====
Contemporary Japanese full names are not meant to be compoundified, but pronounced as separable minor phrases:

- Ono Masao (小野正男; /ono (|) masao/), Yamada Kazuyo (山田和代; /jamada (|) kazɯjo/), Matsumoto Ichirō (松本一郎; /matsɯmoto (|) icɕiɾoR/), etc.
- Ono Shōichi (小野正一; /ono (|) ɕoRícɕi/), Yoshida Toshiaki (吉田敏明; /joɕida (|) toɕíaki/), Matsumoto Kazuhiko (松本一彦; /matsɯmoto (|) kazɯ́hi̥ko/), etc.
- Ono Yuki (小野雪; /ono (|) jɯ́ki/), Yoshida Akira (吉田明; /joɕida (|) ákiɾa/), Matsumoto Ranko (松本蘭子; /matsɯmoto (|) ɾáNko/), etc.
- Yamashita Masao (山下正男; /jamáɕi̥ta (|) masao/), Hara Kazuyo (原和代; /háɾa (|) kazɯjo/), Tamura Fumie (田村文恵; /támɯɾa (|) ɸɯmie/), Satō Sasuke (佐藤佐助; /sátoR (|) sasɯ̥ke/), Andō Ichirō (安藤一郎; /áNdoR (|) icɕiɾoR/), etc.
- Nishimura Shōichi (西村正一; /niɕímɯɾa | ɕoRícɕi ~ niɕímɯɾa ɕoRicɕi/), Hara Toshiaki (原敏明; /háɾa | toɕíaki ~ háɾa toɕiaki/), Satō Kazuhiko (佐藤一彦; /sátoR | kazɯ́hi̥ko ~ sátoR kazɯhi̥ko/), Andō Shinsaku (安藤信作; /áNdoR | ɕiNsakɯ́ ~ áNdoR ɕiNsakɯ/), etc.
- Nishimura Yuki (西村雪; /niɕímɯɾa | jɯ́ki ~ niɕímɯɾa jɯki/), Hara Akira (原明; /háɾa | ákiɾa ~ háɾa akiɾa/), Satō Ranko (佐藤蘭子; /sátoR | ɾáNko ~ sátoR ɾaNko/), Andō Shizuka (安藤静香; /áNdoR | ɕízɯka ~ áNdoR ɕizɯka/), etc.

Phonetically, given names even if downstepped still have slightly higher pitch contours than common nouns, for example occupational titles (see Japanese pitch accent rules (affixes) § Long Sino-Japanese occupational titles and establishment types). In other words, Haruka in Morita Haruka (森田春香; /móɾita | háɾɯka/) has a slightly higher contour than hakase in Morita Hakase (森田博士; /móɾita | hákase/ 'Dr Morita'). In accent dictionaries, Japanese full names with both accented components are more likely notated as two phrases, while common nouns are more likely one phrase. Compare differences in notation:

Noun	Hirayama (2010:329, 540)	Kindaichi & Akinaga (2025:397, 625)	NHK Broadcasting Culture Research Institute (2025:609, 948, [91]–[92])
Tokugawa Ieyasu (徳川家康)	ト ク カ゚ワイエヤス ト ク カ゚ワ・イ エ ヤス	ト ク カ゚ワ・イ エ ヤス	トクカ゚＼ワ・イエ＼ヤス
jūgonichi (十五日; 'the fifteenth day')	ジュ ゴニチ (Note: This entry does not actually exist, but this is how it would be notated based on how jūgoji (十五時; 'the fifteenth hour') is.)	ジュ ゴニチ	ジュ＼ウ・ゴ＼ニチ ジュ＼ウゴニチ

Historical full names, on the other hand, are more likely compoundified:

- Ashikaga Takauji (足利尊氏; /aɕi̥káɡa | takáɯʑi ~ aɕi̥káɡa takaɯʑi ~ aɕi̥kaɡa takáɯʑi/), Tokugawa Ieyasu (徳川家康; /tokɯ́ɡawa (|) iejasɯ ~ tokɯ́ɡawa | iéjasɯ ~ tokɯɡawa iéjasɯ/), etc.
- Katsushika Hokusai (葛飾北斎; /katsɯ́ɕi̥ka | hókɯ̥sai ~ katsɯ̥ɕi̥ka hókɯ̥sai ~ katsɯ́ɕi̥ka (|) hokɯ̥sai ~ katsɯ́ɕi̥ka | hokɯ̥sái/), Tsubouchi Shōyō (坪内逍遥; /tsɯbóɯcɕi | ɕóRjoR ~ tsɯboɯcɕi̥ ɕóRjoR ~ tsɯbóɯcɕi (|) ɕoRjoR/), Nagai Kafū (永井荷風; /náɡai | káɸɯR ~ náɡai kaɸɯR ~ naɡai káɸɯR/), etc.

Stage family names and titles work similarly to family names:

- Zeniya Gohei (銭屋五兵衛; /zenija (|) ɡóhei/), Shiobara Tasuke (塩原多助; /ɕióbaɾa (|) tasɯ̥ke/), Ichiryūsai Teizan (一竜斎貞山; /icɕiɾjɯ́Rsai | téizaN ~ icɕiɾjɯ́Rsai teizaN/), etc.
- Genzanmi Yorimasa (源三位頼政; /ɡeNzáNmi | joɾímasa ~ ɡeNzáNmi joɾimasa/ 'Yorimasa, Third Rank of Minamoto'), Noto no Kami Noritsune (能登守教経; /noto nó kami | noɾítsɯne ~ noto nó kami noɾítsɯne/ 'Noritsune, Chief of Noto'), etc.

Dvandvas work similarly, though it is common to pronounced them as one phrase: Okaru Kanpei (お軽勘平; /o-káɾɯ (|) kaNpei/ 'o-Karu and Kanpei'), Onatsu Seijūrō (お夏清十郎; /o-nátsɯ̥ (|) seiʑɯRɾoR/ 'o-Natsu and Seijūrō'), Koharu Jihē (小春治兵衛; /kohaɾɯ (|) ʑíheR/ 'Koharu and Jihē'), Kan'ichi Omiya (貫一お宮; /kaNicɕi (|) o-míja/ 'Kan'ichi and o-Miya'), Umegawa Chūbē (梅川忠兵衛; /ɯmeɡawa (|) cɕɯ́RbeR/ 'Umegawa and Chūbē'), etc.

==== Sino-Japanese Chinese names ====
Two-kanji Chinese names are accented on the first kanji's first mora: To Ho (杜甫; /tó ho/ 'Du Fu'), Ri Haku (李白; /ɾí hakɯ/ 'Li Bai'), Kō U (項羽; /kóR ɯ/ 'Xiang Yu'), Sō Sō (曹操; /sóR soR/ 'Cao Cao'), etc.

Three-kanji names are accented on the second kanji's first mora:

- Yō Kihi (楊貴妃; /joR kí̥hi/ 'the Honorable Consort Yang'), So Tōba (蘇東坡; /so tóRba/ 'Su Dongpo'), Haku Rakuten (白楽天; /hakɯ ɾákɯ̥teN/ 'Bai Letian'), Mō Takutō (毛沢東; /moR tákɯ̥toR/ 'Mao Zedong'), etc.
- Shiba Sen (司馬遷; /ɕibá seN/ 'Sima Qian'), etc.

Note that these rules only account for Sino-Japanese names, not Modern-Mandarin-derived transcriptions of names such as Mao Tsōton ('Mao Zedong').

==== Western names ====
Western names are regular recent-loanword compounds with the given names as modifiers and the family names as heads (see Japanese pitch accent rules § Compounds with recent-loanword heads): Heren Kerā (ヘレンケラー; /heɾeN kéɾaR/ 'Helen Keller'), Shārokku Hōmuzu (シャーロックホームズ; /ɕaRɾoQkɯ̥ hóRmɯzɯ/ 'Sherlock Holmes'), Jannu Daruku (ジャンヌダルク; /ʑaNnɯ dáɾɯkɯ/ 'Jeanne d'Arc'), Maruko Pōro (マルコポーロ; /maɾɯko póRɾo/ 'Marco Polo'), Don Kihōte (ドンキホーテ; /doN ki̥hóRte/ 'Don Quixote'), etc.

=== Placenames ===
Many placenames in Tokyo and nearby areas are unaccented, which conforms to the aforementioned principle of deaccentuating high-frequency or familiar words: Edo (江戸; /edo/), Mita (三田; /mita/), Ueno (上野; /ɯeno/), Kanda (神田; /kaNda/), Ginza (銀座; /ɡiNza/), Shibuya (渋谷; /ɕibɯja/), Nakano (中野; /nakano/), Edogawa (江戸川; /edoɡawa/), Shinjuku (新宿; /ɕiNʑɯkɯ/), etc.

A select few western placenames, some borrowed earlier on, are also unaccented: Porutogaru (ポルトガル; /poɾɯtoɡaɾɯ/; 'Portugal'), Igirisu (イギリス; /iɡiɾisɯ/; 'England ~ the UK'), Furansu (フランス; /ɸɯɾaNsɯ/; 'France'), Ejiputo (エジプト; /eʑipɯ̥to/; 'Egypt'), Amerika (アメリカ; /ameɾika/; 'America'), Afurika (アフリカ; /aɸɯɾika/; 'Africa'), Shiberia (シベリア; /ɕibeɾia/; 'Siberia'), Itaria (イタリア; /itaɾia/; 'Italy'), Betonamu (ベトナム; /betonamɯ/; 'Vietnam'), etc.

Most other placenames conform to the antepenultimate rule; if they are trimoraic or shorter, they tend to be initial-accented:

- Tsu (津; /tsɯ́/), Ise (伊勢; /íse/), Kure (呉; /kɯ́ɾe/), Nara (奈良; /náɾa/), Chiba (千葉; /cɕíba/), Mie (三重; /míe/), Akita (秋田; /áki̥ta/), Izumo (出雲; /ízɯmo/), Iwate (岩手; /íwate/), Kyōto (京都; /kjóRto/), Kōbe (神戸; /kóRbe/), Nagoya (名古屋; /náɡoja/), Hyōgo (兵庫; /hjóRɡo/), Yamato (大和; /jámato/), Shizuoka (静岡; /ɕizɯ́oka/), Nagasaki (長崎; /naɡásaki/), Fukuoka (福岡; /ɸɯ̥kɯ́oka/), Wakayama (和歌山; /wakájama/), etc.
- Go (呉; /ɡó/; 'Wu'), So (楚; /só/; 'Chu'), Kan (漢・韓; /káN/; 'Han'), Gen (元; /ɡéN/; 'Yuan'), Tō (唐; /tóR/; 'Tang'), Seian (西安; /séiaN/; 'Xi'an'), Tai (泰; /tái/; 'Thailand'), Indo (印度; /íNdo/; 'India'), etc.
- Yōroppa (ヨーロッパ; /joRɾóQpa/; 'Europe'), Rōma (ローマ; /ɾóRma/; 'Rome'), Pari (パリ; /páɾi/; 'Paris'), Suisu (スイス; /sɯ́isɯ/; 'Switzerland'), Doitsu (ドイツ; /dóitsɯ/; 'Germany'), Kanada (カナダ; /kánada/; 'Canada'), Biruma (ビルマ; /bíɾɯma/; 'Birma'), Perū (ペルー; /péɾɯR/; 'Peru'), Supein (スペイン; /sɯ̥péiN/; 'Spain'), Chibetto (チベット; /tibéQto/; 'Tibet'), Nepāru (ネパール; /nepáRɾɯ/; 'Nepal'), Nyū Yōku (ニューヨーク; /njɯR jóRkɯ/; 'New York'), Suwēden (スウェーデン; /sɯwéRdeN/; 'Sweden'), Washinton (ワシントン; /waɕíNtoN/; 'Washington'), Ōsutoraria (オーストラリア; /oRsɯ̥toɾáɾia/; 'Australia'), Hawai (ハワイ; /háwai/; 'Hawaii'), Roshia (ロシア; /ɾóɕia/; 'Russia'), etc.

Some placenames are alternatively penultimate-accented or unaccented if the antepenultimate mora is special or devoiced (the dagger ^{†} marks obsolete or obsolescent accent):

- Rikuchū (陸中; /ɾikɯ̥́cɕɯR → ɾikɯ̥cɕɯ́R/), etc.
- Etchū (越中; /éQcɕɯR ~ eQcɕɯ́R/), Bitchū (備中; /bíQcɕɯR ~ biQcɕɯ́R/), Ryūkyū (琉球; /ɾjɯRkjɯ́R/), etc.
- Ōita (大分; /oRita ~ óRita/), Ōsumi (大隅; /óRsɯmi ~ oRsɯmi/), Kōzuke (上野; /kóRzɯke/), Saitama (埼玉・さいたま; /sáitama ~ ^{†}saitama/), etc.

Long compound placenames behave like long compound common nouns, whether compoundified or non-compoundified see (Japanese pitch accent rules § Non-compoundified compounds):

- tokoro + sawa → Tokorozawa (所+沢→所沢; 'a place + marsh → Tokorozawa'): /tokoɾo + sawá → tokoɾo-zawa ~ tokoɾó-zawa/
- hira + izumi → Hiraizumi (平+泉→平泉; 'the flat + a spring → Hiraizumi'): /híɾa + izɯmi → hiɾa-ízɯmi/
- higashi + Nakano → Higashinakano (東+中野→東中野; 'east + Nakano → Higashinakano'): /hiɡaɕi ~ hiɡaɕí + nakano → hiɡaɕi-nákano/
- shin + Ōkubo → Shin'ōkubo (新+大久保→新大久保; 'new + Ōkubo → Shin'ōkubo'): /ɕíN + oRkɯbo → ɕiN-óRkɯbo/
- hara → Akihabara (原→秋葉原; 'a plain → Akihabara'): /háɾa → aki̥há-baɾa/
- ike + fukuro → Ikebukuro (池+袋→池袋; 'a pond + a bag → Ikebukuro'): /iké + ɸɯ̥kɯɾó → ike-bɯ́kɯɾo/
- Izu + Nagaoka → Izunagaoka (伊豆+長岡→伊豆長岡): /izɯ + naɡáoka → izɯ-naɡáoka/
- ocha + no + mizu → Ochanomizu (御茶+の+水→御茶ノ水; 'tea + 's + water → Ocha no Mizu'): /ocɕa + no + mizɯ → ocɕa no mizɯ/

Dvandvas tend to be non-compoundified:

- Kyōto + Nara → Kyōto–Nara (京都+奈良→京都・奈良): /kjóRto + náɾa → kjóRto | náɾa/
- Indo + Pakisutan → Indo–Pakisutan (印度+パキスタン→印度・パキスタン; 'India + Pakistan → India–Pakistan'): /íNdo + pakísɯ̥taN → íNdo | pakísɯ̥taN/

=== Clipped proper nouns ===
==== Bimoraic clippings ====
Bimoraic clippings tend to be initial-accented:

- Yotarō → Yota (与太郎→与太): /jotaɾoR → jóta/
- Takarazuka → Zuka (宝塚→づか): /takaɾázɯka → zɯ́ka/
- Shinjuku → Juku (新宿→じゅく): /ɕiNʑɯkɯ → ʑɯ́kɯ/
- Takada no Baba → Baba (高田馬場→馬場): /takada no bába → bába/
- Ebizōsama → Ebisama (海老蔵様→海老様): /ebizóR-sama → ébi-sama/
- Kumagorōsan → Kumasan (熊五郎さん→熊さん): /kɯmáɡoɾoR → kɯ́ma-saN/
- Hachirōsan → Hattsan (八五郎さん→八つぁん): /hacɕíɡoɾoR-saN → háQ-tsaN/
- Yamadasan; Yamaguchisan → Yamasan (山田さん・山口さん→山さん): /jamada-saN; jamáɡɯcɕi̥-saN → jáma-saN/
- Hidekochan → Hidechan; Dekochan (秀子ちゃん→秀ちゃん・でこちゃん): /hídeko-cɕaN → híde-cɕaN; déko-cɕaN/
- Masaochan → Māchan; Matchan (正男ちゃん→まあちゃん・まっちゃん): /masao-cɕaN → máR-cɕaN; máQ-cɕaN/
- Satōsan; Sasakisan → Sāsan (佐藤さん・佐佐木さん→さあさん): /sátoR-saN; sasaki̥-saN → sáR-saN/

==== Tri- and quadrimoraic clippings ====
Tri- and quadrimoraic clippings tend to be unaccented:

- Ikebukuro → Bukuro (池袋→ぶくろ): /ikebɯ́kɯɾo → bɯkɯɾo/
- Akihabara → Akiha ~ Akiba (秋葉原→秋葉): /akihábaɾa → aki̥ha ~ akiba/
- Yūrakuchō → Rakuchō (有楽町→楽町): /jɯRɾakɯ̥́cɕoR → jɯRɾákɯ̥cɕoR → ɾakɯ̥cɕoR/
- Zeniya Gohei → Zenigo (銭屋五兵衛→銭五): /zenija | ɡóhei ~ zenija ɡóhei → zeniɡo/
- Kinokuniya Bunzaemon → Kibun (紀国屋文左衛門→紀文): /kinokɯnija (|) bɯNzáemoN ~ kinokɯnija (|) bɯ́NzaemoN → kibɯN/
- Enomoto Ken'ichi → Enoken (榎本健一→榎健): /enomoto (|) keNicɕi ~ enomoto (|) keNicɕí ~ enomoto (|) keNícɕi → enokeN/
- Tōkyō + Yokohama → Tōyoko (東京+横浜→東横; 'Tokyo + Yokohama → Tokyo–Yokohama'): /toRkjoR + jokohama → toRjoko/
- Tōkyō + Chiba → Keiyō (東京+千葉→京葉; 'Tokyo + Chiba → Tokyo–Chiba'): /toRkjoR + cɕíba → keijoR/
- Tōkyō + Narita → Keisei (東京+成田→京成; 'Tokyo + Narita → Tokyo–Narita'): /toRkjoR + náɾita → keisei/
- Kyōto + Ōsaka → Keihan (京都+大阪→京阪; 'Kyoto + Osaka → Kyoto–Osaka'): /kjóRto + oRsaka → keihaN ~ kéihaN/
- Bōshū + Sōshū → Bōsō (房州+総州→房総; 'Awa Province + Kazusa Province → Awa–Kazusa'): /bóRɕɯR + sóRɕɯR → boRsoR/
- Yajirobē + Kitahachi ~ Kidahachi → Yajikita ~ Yajikida (弥次郎兵衛+喜多八→弥次喜多): /jaʑiɾóbeR + ki̥tahacɕi ~ kidahacɕi → jaʑiki̥ta ~ jaʑikida/
- Kōshi + Mōshi → Kōmō (孔子+孟子→孔孟; 'Confucius + Mencius → Confucius and Mencius'): /koRɕi + moRɕi → koRmoR/
- Rōshi + Sōshi → Rōsō (老子+荘子→老荘; 'Laozi + Zhuangzi → Laozi and Zhuangzi'): /ɾoRɕi + soRʑi → ɾoRsoR/

Some are accented like short Sino-Japanese dvandvas (see Japanese pitch accent rules § Double dvandvas):

- Kōyō + Rohan → Kōro (紅葉+露伴→紅露; 'Kōyō + Rohan → Kōyō and Rohan'): /kóRjoR ~ koRjoR + ɾóhaN → kóRɾo/
- Tosa + Hizen → Tohi (土佐+肥前→土肥; 'Tosa + Hizen → Tosa–Hizen'): /tósa + hízeN → tóhi/
- Sasshū + Chōshū → Satchō (薩州+長州→薩長; 'Satsuma Province + Nagato Province → Satsuma–Nagato'): /sáQɕɯR + cɕóRɕɯR → sáQcɕoR/
- Nippon + Chūgoku → Nitchū (日本+中国→日中; 'Japan + China → Japan–China'): /niQpóN + cɕɯ́Rɡokɯ → níQcɕɯR/
- Nippon + Amerika → Nichibei (日本+亜米利加→日米; 'Japan + America → Japan–America'): /niQpóN + ameɾika → nícɕibei/
- Amerika + Soren → Beiso (亜米利加+ソ連→米ソ; 'America + the Soviet Union → America–Soviet'): /ameɾika + sóɾeN → béiso/

Some elliptical clippings may retain the original noun's accent:

- Keiō + gijuku + daigaku → Keiō Gijuku Daigaku → Keiō (慶応+義塾+大学→慶応大学→慶応; 'Keiō + a donation-funded private school + university → Keio University → Keio'): /keioR + ɡíʑɯkɯ + daiɡakɯ → keioR ɡiʑɯkɯ dáiɡakɯ → keioR/
- Meiji + daigaku → Meiji Daigaku → Meiji (明治+大学→明治大学→明治; 'Meiji + university → Meiji University → Meiji'): /méiʑi + daiɡakɯ → meiʑi dáiɡakɯ → méiʑi/
- asahi + shinbun → Asahi Shinbun → Asahi (朝日+新聞→朝日新聞→朝日; 'the morning sun + a newspaper → The Asahi Shimbun → The Asahi'): /ásahi + ɕiNbɯN → asahi̥ ɕíNbɯN → ásahi/
  - But: mainichi + shinbun → Mainichi Shinbun → Mainichi (毎日+新聞→毎日新聞→毎日; 'every day + a newspaper → the Mainichi Shimbun → the Mainichi'): /máinicɕi + ɕiNbɯN → mainicɕi̥ ɕíNbɯN → mainicɕi/

==== Quinquemoraic or longer clippings ====
Quinquemoraic or longer clippings tend to behave like long compounds:

- Jōshū + {Shinshū + Esshū → Shin'etsu} → Jōshin'etsu (上州+{信州+越州→信越}→上信越; 'Kōzuke Province + {Shinano Province + Echigo Province → Shinano–Echigo} → Kōzuke–Shinano–Echigo'): /ʑóRɕɯR + {ɕíNɕɯR + éQɕɯR → ɕiNetsɯ ~ ɕíNetsɯ} → ʑoRɕíNetsɯ/
- Kyōto + {Ōsaka + Kōbe → Hanshin} → Keihanshin (京都+{大阪+神戸→阪神}→京阪神; 'Kyoto + {Osaka + Kobe → Osaka–Kobe} → Kyoto–Osaka–Kobe'): /kjóRto + {oRsaka + kóRbe → háNɕiN} → keiháNɕiN/
- {Genji + Heishi → Genpei} + Tōshi + Tachibana → Genpei Tōkitsu ({源氏+平氏→源平}+藤氏+橘→源平藤橘; '{the Minamoto clan + the Taira clan → Minamoto–Taira} + the Fujiwara clan + Tachibana → Minamoto–Taira–Fujiwara–Tachibana'): /{ɡeNʑi + héiɕi → ɡeNpei} + tóRɕi + tacɕíbana → ɡeNpei (|) toRki̥tsɯ ~ ɡeNpei tóRki̥tsɯ/

== Pronouns, attributives, adverbs and conjunctions ==
Pronouns, attributives (連体詞, rentaishi), adverbs and conjunctions generally behave like nouns before particles and auxiliaries:

- kore (此れ; 'this thing'): /koɾe → koɾe wa, koɾe máde, koɾe kóso, koɾe náɾa, koɾe bákaɾi, koɾe daɾóR/
- kochira (此方; 'this place'): /kocɕiɾa → kocɕiɾa ni/
- dare (誰; 'who'): /dáɾe → dáɾe kaɕiɾa, dáɾe daɾoR ~ dáɾe | daɾóR/
- itsu (何時; 'when'): /ítsɯ → ítsɯ̥ ka/
- amata (数多; 'in large numbers'): /ámata → ámata no/
- tsugitsugi (次々; 'one after another'): /tsɯɡítsɯɡi → tsɯɡítsɯɡi ni/

Some unaccented words can become final-accented:

- tokidoki (時々; 'sometimes'): /tokidoki → tokidoki wa ~ tokidokí wa/
- mattaku (全く; 'entirely'): /maQtakɯ → maQtakɯ no ~ maQtakɯ́ no, maQtakɯ́ da, maQtakɯ́ desɯ/
- yohodo (余程; 'greatly'): /johodo → johodo désɯ ~ johodó desɯ/
- sekkaku (折角; 'kindly'): /seQkakɯ → seQkakɯ́ desɯ/

=== Old-Japanese-derived ‑re personal pronouns, demonstratives and indefinites ===
Most of the Old Japanese-derived ‑re personal pronouns and their genitive forms are initial-accented:

	First person (一人称・自称, ichininshō/jishō)	Second person (二人称・対称, nininshō/taishō)	Indefinite (不定称, fukuteishō)
Singular	ware → are (我・吾): /wáɾe → áɾe/ 'I/me → I/me, elevatedly speaking'	nare (汝): /náɾe/ 'thou/thee'	tare (誰): /táɾe/ 'who(ever)/whom(ever) → who(ever)/whom(ever), elevatedly speaking' → dare: /dáɾe/ 'who(ever)/whom(ever)'
Singular	ore → oi (俺・己): /oɾe → oi/ 'I/me → I/me, a very informal male'	ore (爾・儞): /oɾe/ 'thou/thee, mine inferior'	
Plural	wareware (我々): /waɾewaɾe/ 'we/us → we/us, elevatedly speaking' warera (我等): /wáɾeɾa/ 'we/us → we/us, elevatedly speaking'		daredare (誰々): /dáɾedaɾe/ 'who(ever)/whom(ever)'
Plural	orera → oira (俺等・己等): /oɾéɾa → óiɾa/ 'we/us → we/us including me, a very informal male'	orera (爾等・儞等): /oɾéɾa/ 'ye/you, mine inferiors'	
Ga genitive	wa ga (我が・吾が): /wá ɡa/ 'mine/my → my, elevatedly speaking → our, elevatedly speaking'	na ga (汝が): /ná ɡa/ 'thine/thy'	ta ga (誰が): /tá ɡa/ 'whose(ever) → whose(ever), elevatedly speaking'

The ko‑, so‑ and a‑ demonstratives are mostly unaccented, while the ka‑ demonstratives and do‑ indefinites are mostly initial-accented:

	Proximal (近称, kinshō) ko‑ (此; '(…) this/these […] close to me')	Mesial (中称, chūshō) so‑ (其; '(…) that/those […] close to you')	Distal (遠称, enshō) (k)a‑ (彼; '(…) that/those […] far from you and me')	Indefinite (不定称, fukuteishō) izu‑ → do‑ (何; '(…) which(ever) […]')
‑re (れ; '… [thing/person]')	/koɾe/	/soɾe/	/aɾe ~ káɾe/	/izɯɾe → dóɾe/
‑rera (れ等; '… [things/people]')	/koɾéɾa/	/soɾéɾa/	/aɾéɾa ~ káɾeɾa/	
‑re ‑re (れ…れ; '… [thing/person] and … [thing/person]')	/koɾékoɾe/	/soɾézoɾe ~ soɾezóɾe/		/dóɾedoɾe ~ doɾedoɾe/
wa (は; '(as for) …')	/koɾe wa ~ kó wa/	/soɾe wa ~ só wa/	/aɾe wa ~ káɾe wa/	
no (の; '… [<noun>]')	/ko no/	/so no/	/a no ~ ká no/	/dó no/
no ko (の子; '… [child]')	/ko nó ko/	/so nó ko/	/a nó ko/	/dó no ko/
‑nata (方; '… [direction/person]')	/kónata ~ konáta/	/sónata ~ sonáta ~ sonata/	/(k)ánata ~ (k)anáta/	/dónata/
‑chi (方; '… [direction/person]')	/kócɕi ~ {kocɕí → koQcɕí}/	/sócɕi ~ {socɕí → soQcɕí}/	/ácɕi ~ {acɕí → aQcɕí}/	/ízɯcɕi → dócɕi → dóQcɕi/
‑chira (方; '… [direction/person]')	/kocɕiɾa/	/socɕiɾa/	/acɕiɾa/	/dócɕiɾa/
‑ko (処・所; '… [place]')	/koko/	/soko/	{ashiko → asoko → asuko} ~ kashiko (彼処・彼所): /{aɕi̥ko → asoko → asɯ̥ko} ~ káɕi̥ko/ → kashiku (畏): /káɕi̥kɯ/	/{ízɯkɯ → ízɯko → dóko} ~ {izɯkɯ → izɯko}/
‑kora (処ら; '(around) … [place]')	/kokóɾa/	/sokóɾa/	asokora → asukora (彼処ら・彼所ら): /asokóɾa → asɯ̥kóɾa/	/dókoɾa/
yatsu → ‑itsu (奴; '… [guy/gal]')	/{kojatsɯ → koitsɯ} ~ kójatsɯ ~ kojátsɯ/	/{sojatsɯ → soitsɯ} ~ sójatsɯ ~ sojátsɯ/	/{ajatsɯ → aitsɯ} ~ ájatsɯ ~ ajátsɯ/	/dójatsɯ → dóitsɯ/
‑itsura (奴等; '… [guys/gals]')	/koitsɯ́ɾa/	/soitsɯ́ɾa/	/aitsɯ́ɾa/	/dóitsɯɾa/
‑nna (様; '(like) …')	/koNna/	/soNna/	/aNna/	/dóNna/
/R/ ('(in) … [manner]')	kō (斯う): /koR/	sō (然う): /soR/	ā (ああ): /aR/	dō (如何): /dóR/

Other indefinites are usually initial-accented:

- nani (何; /náni/ 'what'), nani ka (何か; /náni ka/ 'something'), nan de (何で; /náN de/ 'why'), nan da (何だ; /náN da/ 'is what'), nannin (何人; /náNniN/ 'how many people'), nanji; itsu (何時; /náNʑi; ítsɯ/ 'what time; when'), naze (何故; /náze/ 'why'), ikutsu (幾つ; /íkɯ̥tsɯ/ 'how many'), ikura (幾ら; /íkɯɾa/ 'how much'), etc.
- But: nanibito ~ nanbito ~ nanpito (何人; /nanibito ~ naNbito ~ naNpito/ 'everyone'), naniyue (何故; /nanijɯe/ 'why'), nandoki (何時; /naNdoki/ 'what time ~ when'), nanitozo (何卒; /nanitozo/ 'by any means'), etc.

=== Verbal attributives ===
Attributives derived from archaic verbal attributives (see Japanese pitch accent rules (verbs and adjectives) § Conjugational verbal forms) simply keep their regular accent:

- {aru} + hi → aru hi ({有る→或る}+日→或る日; '{that exists → a certain} + a day → a certain day'): /{áɾɯ} + hí → áɾɯ hi/
- {aru → saru} + mono → saru mono ({有る→然る}+者→然る者; '{that exists → quite a certain} + a person → quite a certain character'): /{áɾɯ → sáɾɯ} + monó → sáɾɯ mono/
- {kaku + aru → kakaru} + jitai → kakaru jitai ({斯く+有る→斯かる}+事態→斯かる事態; '{thus + that exists → such} + a situation → such a situation'): /{kákɯ + áɾɯ → kakáɾɯ} + ʑítai → kakáɾɯ | ʑítai/
- {arayuru} + shudan → arayuru shudan ({有らゆる}+手段→有らゆる手段; '{that can exist → all} + a measure → all measures'): /{aɾajɯ́ɾɯ} + ɕɯ́daN → aɾajɯ́ɾɯ | ɕɯ́daN/
- {ōki naru → ōki na} + kao → ōki na kao ({大きなる→大きな}+顔→大きな顔; '{that is big} + a face → a haughty front'): /{óRki naɾɯ → óRki na} + kao → óRki na (|) kao/
- kaku taru + koto → kaku taru koto (確たる+事→確たる事; 'that is definite + a matter → a definite matter'): /kákɯ̥ taɾɯ + kotó → kákɯ̥ taɾɯ koto ~ kákɯ̥ taɾɯ | kotó/
- {akuru} + asa → akuru asa ({明くる}+朝→明くる朝; '{that shall dawn → the next} + the morning → the next morning'): /{akɯɾɯ} + ása → akɯɾɯ ása/
- {mihatenu} + yume → mihatenu yume ({見果てぬ}+夢→見果てぬ夢; '{that one shan't see through → unrealized} + a dream → an unrealized dream'): /{mihatenɯ ~ mihaténɯ} + jɯmé → mihatenɯ (|) jɯmé ~ mihaténɯ jɯme ~ mihaténɯ | jɯmé/
- {tonda} + koto → tonda koto ({飛んだ→とんだ}+事→とんだ事; '{that has flown → surprising} + a thing → a surprising thing'): /{toNda} + kotó → toNda kotó/

=== Noun- and demonstrative-derived personal pronouns ===
Personal pronouns that are etymologically nouns or demonstratives with pronominal uses generally do not have different accent (they, them and their are singular and gender-neutral here):

- Primarily first-person:
  - watakushi (私): /watakɯ̥ɕi/ 'privacy → I/me → I/me, my formally polite self ~ {I/me, my neutrally polite self → I/me, a female}'
    - → watashi: /wataɕi/ 'I/me, my neutrally polite self → I/me, a female'
      - → watai: /watai/ 'I/me, an informal female'
        - → wate: /wate/ 'I/me, an informal female Kansaian → I/me, an informal male Kansaian'
      - → wasshi ~ watchi: /waQɕi ~ waQcɕi/ 'I/me, a working-class person'
        - → washi (私・儂): /waɕi/ 'I/me, a working-class woman → I/me, your adult male superior'
          - → wai: /wai/ 'I/me, a working-class person → you, my peer/inferior'
    - → atakushi: /atakɯ̥ɕi/ 'I/me, my neutrally polite self'
      - → atashi: /ataɕi/ 'I/me, my informally polite self → I/me, an informal female'
        - → atai: /atai/ 'I/me, my very informally polite self → I/me, a very informal female'
          - → ate: /ate/ 'I/me, a very informal female Kansaian'
        - → asshi: /aQɕi/ 'I/me, a working-class person'
          - → ashi: /aɕi/ 'I/me, a male'
  - boku (僕): /bókɯ ~ bokɯ/ 'a manservant → I/me, your manservant → I/me, a humble male → I/me, your polite male peer/superior → I/me, a little boy → you, a little boy'
  - setsu (拙): /sétsɯ/ 'lowliness → I/me, a humble man'
    - seppu (拙夫): /séQpɯ/ 'a lowly man → I/me, a humble man'
    - sessō (拙僧): /séQsoR ~ seQsoR/ 'I/me, a humble Buddhist monk'
    - sessha (拙者): /seQɕa/ 'I/me, a humble samurai'
  - yo (余・予): /jó/ 'I/me, a formal man' (compare /jó ~ jo/ 'other')
  - chin (朕): /cɕíN/ 'I/me → we/us, the Emperor'
- Primarily second-person:
  - kimi (君): /kimi/ 'a noble → You, my lord/lady → you, my dear'
  - nushi (主): /nɯ́ɕi/ 'a master → You, my master → you, a respectable person → you, my peer/inferior ~ you, my darling man ~ you/he/him, my darling male customer'
    - → nishi: /níɕi/ 'you, my peer/inferior'
    - onushi (御主): /onɯ́ɕi/ 'you, my peer/inferior'
  - temae (手前): /temae/ 'this side before me → I/me ~ you son of a gun'
    - → temē: /temeR/ 'I/me ~ you son of a gun'
  - omae (御前): /omáe/ 'Your/Their presence' → /omae/ 'you/they/them, a respectable person → you/they/them, my peer/inferior'
    - → omē: /omeR/ 'you, my peer/inferior → you, my inferior'
    - → omai: /omai/ 'you, my peer/inferior'
  - anata (彼方・貴方・貴女・貴男): /ánata ~ anáta/ 'that way far from you and me' → /anáta/ 'you, my peer/superior → you, my respectable peer/inferior ~ you, my romantic partner ~ you, my husband ~ they/them, that respectable person'
    - → anta: /áNta/ 'you, my peer/superior → you, my inferior ~ you, my dear'
- Primarily third-person:
  - yatsuko (奴): /jatsɯ̥ko/ 'a servant → I/me, your servant → I/me, my humble self'
    - → yakko: /jaQko/ 'a servant → they/them, that servant → they/them, that son of a gun'
    - → yatsu: /játsɯ/ 'a son of a gun → they/them, that son of a gun'
  - kare (彼): /káɾe/ 'that one far from you and me → {they/them → he/him → he/him, my boyfriend} ~ you'
  - kijo (貴女): /kíʑo/ 'a noblewoman → you, a lady'

=== Nouns used as adverbs ===
In principle, when a noun is used as an adverb (see Japanese counter words for the grammar), its accent does not change:

- haru + yuku → haru yuku (春+行く→春行く; 'springtime + goes → goes in spring'): /háɾɯ + jɯkɯ → háɾɯ jɯkɯ/
- kyō + yuku → kyō yuku (今日+行く→今日行く; 'today + goes → goes today'): /kjóR + jɯkɯ → kjóR jɯkɯ/
- hitotsu + kau → hitotsu kau (一つ+買う→一つ買う; 'one thing + buys → buys it in one → buys one of it'): /hi̥tótsɯ + kaɯ → hi̥tótsɯ̥ kaɯ/
- gonen + matta → gonen matta (五年+待った→五年待った; 'five years + awaited → awaited it for five years'): /ɡoneN + máQta → ɡoneN máQta/
- But: tsumari (詰まり; /tsɯmaɾí → tsɯ́maɾi/ 'shrinkage → in short'), tsugō (都合; /tsɯɡoR → tsɯ́ɡoR/ 'one's current circumstance → in total'), yurai (由来; /jɯɾai → jɯ́ɾai/ 'the origin → originally'), kekkō (結構; /keQkoR ~ keQkóR → kéQkoR/ 'decent → decently'), etc.

However, final- and medially penultimate-accented nouns with special final morae, that express quantity or time, can be deaccented as adverbs:

- akuru hi + matsu → akuru hi matsu (明くる日+待つ→明くる日待つ; 'the next day + awaits → awaits it the next day'): /akɯɾɯ hí ~ akɯɾɯ hi + mátsɯ → akɯɾɯ hi mátsɯ/
- futatsu + kau → futatsu kau (二つ+買う→二つ有る; 'two things + buys → buys them in two → buys two of them'): /ɸtatsɯ́ + kaɯ → ɸɯ̥tatsɯ̥ kaɯ/
- futairo + aru → futairo aru (二色+有る→二色有る; 'two colors + exists → exist as two colors → there are two colors of them'): /ɸɯ̥táiɾo ~ ɸɯ̥taiɾó + áɾɯ → ɸɯ̥taiɾo áɾɯ/
- futakumi + ita → futakumi ita (二組+居た→二組居た; 'two sets + exists → exist as two sets → there are two sets of them'): /ɸɯ̥takɯmi ~ ɸɯ̥tákɯmi ~ ɸɯ̥takɯmí + ita → ɸɯ̥takɯmi ita/
- hantsuki + tatsu → hantsuki tatsu (半月+立つ→半月立つ; 'half a month + stands → stands for half a month'): /haNtsɯ̥kí + tátsɯ → haNtsɯ̥ki tátsɯ/
- hantoshi + matsu → hantoshi matsu (半年+待つ→半年待つ; 'half a year + awaits → awaits it for half a year'): /haNtoɕí + mátsɯ → haNtoɕi mátsɯ/
- futari + yuku → futari yuku (二人+行く→二人行く; 'two people + goes → goes as two people'): /ɸɯ̥taɾí + jɯkɯ → ɸɯ̥taɾi jɯkɯ/
- hyaku + aru → hyaku aru (百+有る→百有る; 'a hundred + exists → exist as a hundred → there are a hundred of them'): /hjakɯ́ + áɾɯ → hjakɯ áɾɯ/
- gohyaku + tarinai → gohyaku tarinai (五百+足りない→五百足りない; 'five hundred + suffices → don't suffice by five hundred → are five hundred short'): /ɡohjakɯ́ + taɾinai → ɡohjakɯ̥ taɾinai/
- jūichi + kuwaeru → jūichi kuwaeru (十一+加える→十一加える; 'eleven + adds → adds them by eleven → adds eleven more'): /ʑɯRicɕí + kɯwaeɾɯ ~ kɯwaéɾɯ → ʑɯRicɕi kɯwaeɾɯ/
- nido + tabeta → nido tabeta (二度+食べた→二度食べた; 'the second time + ate → ate it for the second time'): /nidó + tábeta → nido tábeta/
- ichinichi + matta → ichinichi matta (一日+待った→一日待った; 'one day + awaited → awaited it for one day'): /icɕinicɕí + máQta → icɕinicɕi máQta/
- nigatsu + kaeru → nigatsu kaeru (二月+帰る→二月帰る; 'February + goes home → goes home in February'): /niɡatsɯ́ + káeɾɯ → niɡatsɯ̥ káeɾɯ/
- shōgatsu + itta → shōgatsu itta (正月+入った→正月入った; 'January + gets in → gets in in January'): /ɕoRɡatsɯ́ + jɯkɯ → ɕoRɡatsɯ iQta/
- natsu + yuku → natsu yuku (夏+行く→夏行く; 'summer + goes → goes in summer'): /natsɯ́ + jɯkɯ → natsɯ jɯkɯ/
- fuyu + kaeru → fuyu kaeru (冬+帰る→冬帰る; 'winter + goes home → goes home in winter'): /ɸɯjɯ́ + káeɾɯ → ɸɯjɯ káeɾɯ/
- asu + yuku → asu yuku (明日+行く→明日行く; 'tomorrow + goes → goes tomorrow'): /asɯ́ + jɯkɯ → asɯ jɯkɯ/
- ashita + kaeru → ashita kaeru (明日+帰る→明日帰る; 'tomorrow + goes home → goes home tomorrow'): /aɕi̥tá + káeɾɯ → aɕi̥ta káeɾɯ/
- yūbe + kaetta → yūbe kaetta (夕べ+帰った→夕べ帰った; 'the evening + went home → went home in the evening'): /jɯRbé + káeQta → jɯRbe káeQta/
- rokujū + sugita → rokujū sugita (六十+過ぎた→六十過ぎた; 'sixty + exceeded → exceeded by sixty → were sixty too many'): /ɾokɯʑɯ́R + sɯ́ɡita → ɾokɯʑɯR sɯ́ɡita/
- ichigō + nonda → ichigō nonda (一合+飲んだ→一合飲んだ; 'one gě + drank → drank it in one gě → drank one gě of it'): /icɕiɡóR ~ icɕíɡoR ~ icɕiɡoR + nóNda → icɕiɡoR nóNda/
- tō + kau → tō kau (十+買う→十買う; 'ten + buys → buys them in ten → buys ten of them'): /tóR + kaɯ → toR kaɯ/
- kinō + mita → kinō mita (昨日+見た→昨日見た; 'yesterday + saw → saw it yesterday'): /kinóR + míta → kinoR míta/
- ōzei + iru → ōzei iru (大勢+居る→大勢居る; 'a flock + exists → exist as a flock → there are a flock of them'): /oRzéi + iɾɯ → oRzei iɾɯ/
- nikai + owaru → nikai owaru (二回+終わる→二回終わる; 'two times + ends → ends twice'): /nikái + owaɾɯ → nikai owaɾɯ/
- ototoi + itta → ototoi itta (一昨日+入った→一昨日入った; 'the day before yesterday + got in → got in the day before yesterday'): /ototói + iQta → ototoi iQta/
- kunin + ita → kunin ita (九人+居た→九人居た; 'nine people + existed → existed as nine people → there were nine of those people'): /kɯníN + ita → kɯniN ita/
- takusan + kau → takusan kau (沢山+買う→沢山買う; 'a large quantity + buys → buys them in a large quantity → buys a lot of them'): /takɯ̥sáN + kaɯ → takɯ̥saN kaɯ/
- hanbun + motsu → hanbun motsu (半分+持つ→半分持つ; 'half + holds → holds it by a half → holds half of it'): /haNbɯ́N + mótsɯ → haNbɯN mótsɯ/

Some younger speakers may ignore this rule:

- natsu + yuku → natsu yuku (夏+行く→夏行く; 'summer + goes → goes in summer'): /natsɯ́ + jɯkɯ → natsɯ́ jɯkɯ/

=== To ideophonic adverbs ===
Adverbs that are ideophones and end in the particle to follow certain patterns as follows.

Trimoraic or shorter to adverbs whose penultimate mora is special tend to be initial-accented:

- fu to (ふと; /ɸɯ̥ to ~ ɸɯ̥́ to/), chi to ~ chitto (些と; /cɕi̥(Q)to ~ cɕí̥ to ~ cɕi̥Qtó/), katto (かっと; /kaQto ~ káQto/), futto (ふっと; /ɸɯ̥́Qto ~ ɸɯ̥Qto/), motto (もっと; /móQto/), watto (わっと; /wáQto/), den to (でんと; /déNto/), pon to (ぽんと; /póN to ~ poN to/), chō to (丁と; /cɕóR to/), pui to (ぷいと; /pɯi to ~ pɯ́i to ~ pɯi tó/), etc.
- But: kitto (屹度; /ki̥Qto/), sotto (そっと; /soQto/), chan to (ちゃんと; /cɕaN to/), etc.

Trimorae whose penultimate mora is not special can be either initial- or penultimate-accented: chira to (ちらと; /cɕiɾá to ~ cɕíɾa to/), etc.

Quadrimorae and sexamoraic reduplicatives whose penultimate mora is /Q/ tend to be accented on the antepenultimate mora, unless that mora is /R/:

- karatto (からっと; /kaɾáQto/), chiratto (ちらっと; /cɕiɾáQto/), kerotto (けろっと; /keɾóQto/), piritto (ぴりっと; /piɾíQto/), piriritto (ぴりりっと; /piɾiɾíQto/), kiraritto (きらりっと; /kiɾaɾíQto/), gororitto (ごろりっと; /ɡoɾoɾíQto/), etc.
- dokidokitto (どきどきっと; /dokidokí̥Qto/), gorogorotto (ごろごろっと; /ɡoɾoɡoɾóQto/), furafuratto (ふらふらっと; /ɸɯɾapɯɾáQto/), buruburutto (ぶるぶるっと; /bɯɾɯbɯɾɯ́Qto/), etc.
- kātto (かあっと; /kaRQto/), fūtto (ふうっと; /ɸɯRQto/), pōtto (ぽおっと; /poRQto/), etc.
- A case where /R/ is accentable: hyūtto (ひゅうっと; /hjɯŔQto/)

Other to adverbs' stems with specific endings:

- ‑ri tems tend to be equally likely penultimate- or final-accented if trimoraic, and mostly penultimate-accented if quadrimoraic:
  - kirari (きらり; /kiɾáɾi ~ kiɾaɾí/), kiriri (きりり; /kiɾíɾi ~ kiɾiɾí/), korori (ころり; /koɾóɾi ~ koɾoɾí/), gorori (ごろり; /ɡoɾóɾi ~ ɡoɾoɾí/), tsururi (つるり; /tsɯɾɯ́ɾi ~ tsɯɾɯɾí/), nikori (にこり; /nikóɾi ~ nikoɾí/), hiyari (ひやり; /hijáɾi ~ hijaɾí/), hiriri (ひりり; /hiɾíɾi ~ hiɾiɾí/), piriri (ぴりり; /piɾíɾi ~ piɾiɾí/), furari (ふらり; /ɸɯɾáɾi ~ ɸɯɾaɾí/), etc.
  - uttori (うっとり; /ɯQtóɾi/), gakkari (がっかり; /ɡaQkáɾi/), sappari (さっぱり; /saQpáɾi/), tappuri (たっぷり; /taQpɯ́ɾi/), pittari (ぴったり; /pi̥Qtáɾi/), yukkuri (ゆっくり; /jɯQkɯ́ɾi/), yuttari (ゆったり; /jɯQtáɾi/)
  - unzari (うんざり; /ɯNzáɾi/), konmori (こんもり; /koNmóɾi/), shonbori (しょんぼり; /ɕoNbóɾi/), shinmiri (しんみり; /ɕiNmíɾi/), funwari (ふんわり; /ɸɯNwáɾi/), yanwari (やんわり; /jaNwáɾi/), etc.
  - But: kokkuri (こっくり; /kóQkɯɾi ~ koQkɯ́ɾi/)
- ‑n stems tend to be penultimate-accented:
  - ton (とん; /tóN/), don (どん; /dóN/), chon (ちょん; /cɕóN/), etc.
  - ka(t)tan (か(っ)たん; /ka(Q)táN/), ga(t)tan (が(っ)たん; /ɡa(Q)táN/), ko(t)ton (こ(っ)とん; /ko(Q)tóN/), goton (ごとん; /ɡotóN/), su(t)ton (す(っ)とん; /sɯ̥(Q)tóN/), pu(t)tsun (ぷ(っ)つん; /pɯ̥(Q)tsɯ́N/), kororin (ころりん; /koɾoɾíN/), tsurun (つるん; /tsɯɾɯ́N/), tsururin (つるりん; /tsɯɾɯɾíN/), buran (ぶらん; /bɯɾáN/), burarin (ぶらりん; /bɯɾaɾíN/), nohohon (のほほん; /nohohóN/), etc.
  - But: gittan (ぎったん; /ɡíQtaN/), battan (ばったん; /báQtaN/)

Reduplicatives whose stem can combine with morphemes other than the particle to behave differently depending on what follows the stem:

- The stem on its own, and when it is followed by to or directly by a verb, tends to be initial-accented, with a possible rightward shift away from the devoiced first mora:
  - kakka (かっか; /káQka/), sesse (せっせ; /séQse/), pappa (ぱっぱ; /páQpa/), etc.
  - gatagata (がたがた; /ɡátaɡata/), gochagocha (ごちゃごちゃ; /ɡócɕaɡocɕa/), kankan (かんかん; /káNkaN/), tonton (とんとん; /tóNtoN/), kirakira (きらきら; /kíɾakiɾa/), kirikiri (きりきり; /kíɾikiɾi/), piripiri (ぴりぴり; /píɾipiɾi/), pīpī (ぴいぴい; /píRpiR/), guragura (ぐらぐら; /ɡɯ́ɾaɡɯɾa/), sarasara (さらさら; /sáɾasaɾa/), zarazara (ざらざら; /záɾazaɾa/), sorosoro (そろそろ; /sóɾosoɾo/), horohoro (ほろほろ; /hóɾohoɾo/), gorogoro (ごろごろ; /ɡóɾoɡoɾo/), gowagowa (ごわごわ; /ɡówaɡowa/), tsurutsuru (つるつる; /tsɯ́ɾɯtsɯɾɯ/), dokidoki (どきどき; /dókidoki/), tobotobo (とぼとぼ; /tóbotobo/), chibichibi (ちびちび; /cɕíbicɕibi/), mojimoji (もじもじ; /móʑimoʑi/), moyamoya (もやもや; /mójamoja/), muyamuya (むやむや; /mɯ́jamɯja/), potsupotsu (ぽつぽつ; /pótsɯ̥potsɯ/), subesube (滑滑; /sɯ́besɯbe/), etc.
  - urochoro (うろちょろ; /ɯ́ɾocɕoɾo/), jitabata (じたばた; /ʑítabata/), dotabata (どたばた; /dótabata/), chirahora (ちらほら; /cɕíɾahoɾa/), hedomodo (へどもど; /hédomodo/), mushakusha (むしゃくしゃ; /mɯ́ɕakɯ̥ɕa/), yakimoki (やきもき; /jákimoki/), etc.
  - shikushiku (しくしく; /ɕí̥kɯɕi̥kɯ → ɕi̥kɯ́ɕi̥kɯ/), fukufuku (ふくふく; /ɸɯ̥́kɯɸɯ̥kɯ → ɸɯ̥kɯ́ɸɯ̥kɯ/), pikupiku (ぴくぴく; /pí̥kɯpi̥kɯ → pi̥kɯ́pi̥kɯ/), pikapika (ぴかぴか; /pí̥kapi̥ka → pi̥kápi̥ka/), kuchakucha (くちゃくちゃ; /kɯ̥́cɕakɯ̥cɕa → kɯ̥cɕákɯ̥cɕa/), sutasuta (すたすた; /sɯ̥́tasɯ̥ta → sɯ̥tásɯ̥ta/), etc.
- However, verb- and adjective-derived stems, tend to be penultimate-accented if they can be followed by the particle to or the verb suru (/sɯɾɯ/ 'does'), but not by the particle *wa (は):
  - akiaki (飽き飽き; /akiáki/ 'very tired'), nobinobi (伸び伸び; /nobinóbi/ 'very comfortable'), harebare (晴れ晴れ; /haɾebáɾe/ 'very cheerful'), etc.
  - aoao (青々; /aoáo/ 'very green'), kuroguro (黒々; /kɯɾoɡɯ́ɾo/ 'very black'), samuzamu (寒々; /samɯzamɯ/ 'very cold'), marumaru (丸々; /maɾɯmáɾɯ/ 'very rotund'), etc.
- Verb- and adjective-derived stems can also be antepenultimate-accented if they can be followed by to, but not by *suru nor *wa (は):
  - ariari (有り有り; /aɾiáɾi/ 'very distinct'), etc.
  - takadaka (高々; /takadáka ~ takádaka/ 'very high'), hayabaya (早々; /hajabája/ 'very early'), etc.
  - harubaru (遥々; /haɾɯbáɾɯ ~ haɾɯ́baɾɯ/ 'very far'), etc.
  - tsukuzuku (熟(々); /tsɯ̥kɯzɯ́kɯ ~ tsɯ̥kɯ́zɯkɯ/ 'very thorough'), etc.
  - samezame (さめざめ; /samezáme ~ samézame/ '(cries) very bitter(ly)'), etc.
- The same stems above, as well as other types of stems, tend to be unaccented if they are uniquely followed by the copular finite verbs da/na and the copular infinitive particle ni (see Japanese conjugation § Copulae: Conjugation table). Compare:
  - gatagata (to) (がたがた(と)): /ɡátaɡata (to) → ɡataɡata ni, ɡataɡata da/
  - tonton (to) (とんとん(と)): /tóNtoN (to) → toNtoN ni, toNtoN da/
  - gowagowa (to) (ごわごわ(と)): /ɡówaɡowa (to) → ɡowaɡowa ni, ɡowaɡowa da/
  - Other examples:
    - kankan da (かんかんだ; /kaNkaN da/), guragura da (ぐらぐらだ; /ɡɯɾaɡɯɾa da/), sarasara da (さらさらだ; /saɾasaɾa da/), zarazara da (ざらざらだ; /zaɾazaɾa da/), tsurutsuru da (つるつるだ; /tsɯɾɯtsɯɾɯ da/), fukufuku da (ふくふくだ; /ɸɯ̥kɯɸɯ̥kɯ da/), gochagocha da (ごちゃごちゃだ; /ɡocɕaɡocɕa da/), kuchakucha da (くちゃくちゃだ; /kɯ̥cɕakɯ̥cɕa da/), etc.
    - mechamecha da (滅茶滅茶だ; /mecɕamecɕa da/ 'is very messy'), mechakucha da (滅茶苦茶だ; /mecɕakɯ̥cɕa da/ 'is very incoherent'), subesube da (滑滑だ; /sɯbesɯbe da/ 'is very smooth'), yamayama da (山々だ; /jamajama da/ 'is mountainously very much'), etc.
    - tobitobi da (飛び飛びだ; /tobitobi da/ 'is very scattered'), nobinobi da (延び延びだ; /nobinobi da/ 'is repeatedly delayed'), etc.
    - atsuatsu da (熱々だ; /atsɯatsɯ da/ 'is very hot'), etc.
  - Some can still be accented: uraura to, uraura ni (うらうらと・うらうらに; /ɯ́ɾaɯɾa to ~ ɯɾaɯ́ɾa to, ɯ́ɾaɯɾa ni ~ ɯɾaɯ́ɾa ni/), chikajika da (近々だ; /cɕi̥kaʑika da ~ cɕi̥káʑika da/ 'is very soon'), tawawa ni (撓わに; /tawawa ni ~ táwawa ni/ '(branches are) heavily (weighed down by fruit)'), etc.

== Adjectival and auxiliary nouns ==
Adjectival and auxiliary nouns are often treated as conjugational (hence the terms keiyō dōshi (形容動詞; lit. 'descriptive verbs') and meishigata jodōshi (名詞型助動詞; lit. 'noun-like auxiliary verbs')). Their so-called "conjugation," however, relies solely on a following copula (see Japanese conjugation § Copulae), typically exemplified by de aru → da (/de áɾɯ → da/).

- jōbu (丈夫; 'robust'): /ʑoRbɯ → ʑoRbɯ de, ʑoRbɯ da, ʑoRbɯ na, ʑoRbɯ ni/
- kirei (綺麗; 'fine'): /kíɾei → kíɾei de, kíɾei da, kíɾei na, kíɾei ni/
- naku + sō → naku sō (泣く+そう; 'cries + it's said → it's said he cries'): /naku → nakɯ̥ sóR de aɾɯ, nakɯ̥ sóR da, nakɯ̥ sóR daɾoR, nakɯ̥ sóR na, nakɯ̥ sóR ni naɾɯ/
- yomu + sō → yomu sō (読み+そう; 'reads + it's said → it's said he reads'): /jómu → jómu soR de aɾɯ ~ jómu | sóR de aɾɯ, jómu soR da ~ jómu | sóR da, jómu soR daɾoR ~ jómu | sóR daɾoR, jómu soR na ~ jómu | sóR na, jómu soR ni naɾɯ ~ jómu | sóR ni naɾɯ/
- naki + sō → nakisō (泣き+そう; 'crying + likely to → likely to cry'): /naki → naki̥soR de áɾɯ, naki̥soR da, naki̥soR daɾóR, naki̥soR na, naki̥soR ni náɾɯ/
- yomi + sō → yomisō (読み+そう; 'reading + likely to → likely to read'): /jómi → jomisóR de aɾɯ, jomisóR da, jomisóR daɾoR, jomisóR na, jomisóR ni naɾɯ/

Adjectival nouns ending in ‑ka are mostly antepenultimate-accented:

- oroka (愚か; /óɾoka/ 'simple-minded'), kasuka (幽か; /kásɯ̥ka/ 'faint'), sayaka (清か; /sájaka/ 'clear'), honoka (仄か; /hónoka/ 'faint'), yutaka (豊か; /jɯ́taka/ 'abundant'), etc.
  - haruka (遥か; 'distant'): /háɾɯka → háɾɯka da, háɾɯka na, háɾɯka ni/
  - kokoro + shizuka → kokoroshizuka (心+静か→心静か; 'a heart + quiet → tranquil'): /kokóɾo ~ kokoɾó + ɕízɯka → kokoɾo-ɕízɯka/
- komayaka (濃やか; /komájaka/ 'caring'), sawayaka (爽やか; /sawájaka/ 'refreshing'), nigiyaka (賑やか; /niɡíjaka/ 'lively'), fukuyoka (膨よか; /ɸɯ̥kɯ́joka/ 'plump'), uraraka (麗らか; /ɯɾáɾaka/ 'splendid'), hogaraka (朗らか; /hoɡáɾaka/ 'clear'), yasuraka (安らか; /jasɯ́ɾaka/ 'tranquil'), etc.
  - ada + orosoka → adaorosoka (徒+疎か→徒疎か; 'malice + negligent → flippant'): /adá + oɾósoka → ada-oɾósoka/
  - iro + azayaka → iroazayaka (色+鮮やか→色鮮やか; 'a color + vivid → colorful'): /iɾó + azájaka → iɾo-azájaka/
- miyabiyaka (雅びやか; /mijabíjaka/ 'graceful'), makotoshiyaka (真しやか; /makotoɕíjaka/ 'plausible'), tsumabiraka (詳らか; /tsɯmabíɾaka/ 'shown in detail'), etc.
- atataka (暖か; /atátaka ~ atatáka → aQtáka/ 'warm'), etc.
  - mono + yawaraka → monoyawaraka (物+柔らか→物柔らか; 'a thing + soft → mild-mannered'): /monó ~ mono + jawáɾaka ~ jawaɾáka → mono-jawáɾaka ~ mono-jawaɾáka/

Adjectival nouns ending in ‑ra, ‑re and ‑ro are mostly unaccented: mabara (疎ら; /mabaɾa/ 'sparse'), itazura (悪戯; /itazɯɾa/ 'mischievous'), gūtara (ぐうたら; /ɡɯRtaɾa/ 'idle'), madara; hadare (斑; /madaɾa; hadaɾe/ 'spotted; flaky'), utsuro (空ろ; /ɯtsɯɾo/ 'empty'), sozoro (漫ろ; /sozoɾo/ 'distracted'), nengoro (懇ろ; /neNɡoɾo/ 'courteous'), etc.

== Interjections ==
Interjections’ accent is often influenced by intonation. Interrogative interjections may sound final-accented because of the rising intonation. Non-derivative interjections tend to be initial-accented, especially those used for calling or responding:

- ā (ああ; /áR/ 'ah'), ē (ええ; /éR/ 'yeah'), ō (おお; /óR/ 'oh'), nā (なあ; /náR/ 'hey'), nē (ねえ; /néR/ 'say'), mā (まあ; /máR/ 'whoa'), yā (やあ; /jáR/ 'gosh'), yō (よう; /jóR/ 'yo'), etc.
- ara (あら; /áɾa/ 'why'), kora (こら; /kóɾa/ 'here'), dora (どら; /dóɾa/ 'come on'), hora (ほら; /hóɾa/ 'there'), etc.
- oi (oi) (おい(おい); /ói (oi)/ 'oi (oi)'), haihai (はい(はい); /hái (hai)/ 'yes (yes)'), yai (やい; /jái/ 'hi'), etc.
- un (un) (うん(うん); /ɯ́N (ɯN)/ 'uh-huh (uh-huh)'), fun (ふん; /ɸɯ́N/ 'hm')
- iza (いざ; /íza/ 'now'), oya (おや; /ója ~ ojá/ 'gee'), otto (おっと; /óQto/ 'oops'), yoisho (よいしょ; /jóiɕo/ 'yo-heave-ho'), etc.
- But: ē? (ええ？; /eŔ/ 'what?'), ara? (あら？; /aɾá/ 'huh?'), oya? (おや？; /ojá/ 'what?'), etc.

Derivatives tend to retain the original accent of the source words:

- shitsurei (失礼; /ɕi̥tsɯ́ɾei/ 'rudeness → excuse me'), banzai (万歳; /baNzái/ 'a myriad years → long live'), baka yarō (馬鹿野郎; /baka jáɾoR ~ baka jaɾóR/ 'idiot'), etc.
- yoshi (好し→よし; /jóɕi/ 'is good → alright'), yoku koso → yō koso (好くこそ→ようこそ; /jókɯ koso → jóR koso/ 'being precisely good → so good to see you'), gokigen yoku → gokigen yō (御機嫌好く→御機嫌好う; /ɡokiɡeN jókɯ → ɡokiɡeN jóR/ 'your mood being good → howdy'), omedetaku → omedetō (御目出度く→おめでとう; /omedetakɯ ~ omedétakɯ → omedetoR/ 'being auspicious → congrats'), etc.
- yasume (休め; /jasɯ́me/ 'rest! → at ease!'), tanomō (頼もう; /tanomóR/ 'I shall request → may I come in?'), mōshi → moshi (moshi) (申し→もし(もし); /móRɕi → móɕi (moɕi)/ 'uttering → hello?'), etc.
- chotto (一寸→ちょっと; /cɕóQto/ 'just a bit'), sate wa (扨は; /sáte wa ~ sate wa/ 'so')
- dore (何れ→どれ; /dóɾe/ 'which one → c'mon'), nani (何→なに; /náni/ 'what'), etc.
- But:
  - shimatta (仕舞った→しまった; /ɕimaQta → ɕimáQta/ 'ended up doing it → dang it')
  - The demontrative-derived interjections are initial-accented: kore (此れ→これ; /koɾe → kóɾe/ 'this one → come now'), sore (其れ→それ; /soɾe → sóɾe/ 'that one close to you → there'), are (彼れ→あれ; /aɾe → áɾe/ 'that one far from you and me → look')
  - Some greetings are final-accented, which can only be realized in the form of a quotation before a particle:
    - tada ima (只今→ただいま; /tadá ima → tada imá/ 'just now → I'm home')
    - konnichi wa (今日は→こんにちは; /kóNnicɕi wa → koNnicɕi wá/ 'as for today → good day')
      - → konnichi wa iwanai de (こんにちはも言わないで; /koNnicɕi wá mo | iwanái de/ 'without saying good day')
    - konban wa (今晩は→こんばんは; /kóNbaN wa → koNbaN wá/ 'as for this evening → good evening')
    - sayō naraba → {sayō nara → sayo nara} (然様ならば→{然様なら→さよなら}; /sajoR náɾaba → {sajoR náɾa ~ sajoR naɾá → sajo náɾa ~ sajo naɾá}/ 'given that is the case → {farewell}')
      - → sayo nara o yū (さよならを言う; /sajo náɾa o jɯR ~ sajo naɾá o jɯR/ 'says farewell')

== Bibliography ==
- Akinaga, Kazue (20 December 1998) [25 April 1998]. 共通語のアクセント. In NHK Broadcasting Culture Research Institute (ed.). NHK日本語発音アクセント辞典 新版 (in Japanese) (5th ed.). Shibuya, Tokyo: NHK Publishing. pp. 174–221. ISBN 4-14-011112-7.
- Hirayama, Teruo, ed. (15 September 2010) [30 June 1960]. 全国アクセント辞典 (in Japanese) (31st ed.). Chiyoda, Tokyo: Tokyodo Shuppan. ISBN 978-4-490-10023-5.
- Kindaichi, Haruhiko; Akinaga, Kazue, eds. (1 April 2025) [10 April 2014]. 新明解日本語アクセント辞典 (in Japanese) (2nd ed.). Chiyoda, Tokyo: Sanseido. ISBN 978-4-385-13468-0.
- Nakai, Yukihiko (1 May 2026) [20 September 2012]. 第10章 複合語のアクセント（１）. An Introduction to Japanese Accent 日本語アクセント入門 (in Japanese) (3rd ed.). Chiyoda, Tokyo: Sanseido. pp. 146–163. ISBN 978-4-385-36531-2.
- NHK Broadcasting Culture Research Institute, ed. (20 December 1998) [25 April 1998]. NHK日本語発音アクセント辞典 新版 (in Japanese) (5th ed.). Shibuya, Tokyo: NHK Publishing. ISBN 4-14-011112-7.
- NHK Broadcasting Culture Research Institute, ed. (20 June 2025) [25 May 2016]. NHK日本語発音アクセント新辞典 (in Japanese) (15th ed.). Shibuya, Tokyo: NHK Publishing. ISBN 978-4-14-011345-5.
- Vance, Timothy John (October 2008). The Sounds of Japanese with Audio CD. Cambridge; New York: Cambridge University Press. ISBN 978-0-521-61754-3.
