= Japanese counter word =

Japanese measure words used with numbers to count things, actions, and events

In Japanese, counter words or counters are measure words used with numbers to count things, actions, and events. Counters are added directly after numbers. There are numerous counters, and different counters are used depending on the kind or shape of nouns that are being described. The Japanese term, josūshi (助数詞; lit. 'helping number word'), appears to have been literally calqued from the English term auxiliary numeral used by Basil Hall Chamberlain in A Handbook of Colloquial Japanese.

In Japanese, as in Chinese and Korean, numerals cannot quantify nouns by themselves (except, in certain cases, for the numbers from one to ten; see below). For example, to express the idea "two dogs" in Japanese one could say either:

二 匹 の 犬
ni hiki no inu
two small-animal-MW POSS dog

犬 二 匹
inu ni hiki
dog two small-animal-MW

but just pasting 二 and 犬 together in either order is ungrammatical. Here 二 ni is the number "two", 匹 hiki is the counter for small animals, の no is the possessive particle (a reversed "of", similar to the " 's" in "John's dog"), and 犬 inu is the word "dog".

Counters are not independent words; they must appear with a numeric prefix. The number can be imprecise: 何 nan or, less commonly, 幾 iku, can both be used to mean "some/several/many", and, in questions, "what/how many/how much". For example:

何 名 様
nan mei sama
some people-MW honored-ones
"some guests"

何 名 様 ？
nan mei sama ?
what people-MW honored-ones Q
"how many guests?"

Some nouns prefer 幾 iku, as in:

幾晩？ iku-ban? "how many nights?"
幾日も行っていた iku-nichi mo itte ita "I was gone for many days."

Counters are similar in function to the word "sheets" in "two sheets of paper" or "cups" in "two cups of coffee". However, they cannot take non-numerical modifiers. So while "two sheets of paper" translates fairly directly as:

紙 二 枚
kami ni mai
paper two flat-MW
"two sheets of paper"

"two green sheets of paper" must be rendered as 緑の紙二枚 midori no kami ni-mai, akin to "two sheets of green paper".

Just as in English, different counters can be used to convey different types of quantity.

パン 一斤
pan ikkin
bread one-loaf
"one loaf of bread"

パン 一枚
pan ichimai
bread one-flat-MW
"one slice of bread"

There are numerous counters, and depending on the kind or shape of nouns the number is describing, different counters are used.

Grammatically, a number–counter sequence can appear either before a noun as an attributive modifier, or after it and before the verb of the sentence as an adverb, in which case some sequences may change their accent (see Japanese pitch accent rules (non-common nouns) § Nouns used as adverbs). In the former case, the number–counter sequence refers to a specific group of that many things or people; in the latter, it refers to any non-specific combination of that many things or people. Compare:

三本 の 鉛筆 を 下さい
sanbon no enpitsu o kudasai
three-long-thin-MW ATTR pencil OBJ give-me-IMP
'Please give me the three pencils'

鉛筆 を 三本 下さい
enpitsu o sanbon kudasai
pencil OBJ three-long-thin-MW give-me-IMP
'Please give me [any] three pencils'

== Phrase structure involving numerals and counters ==
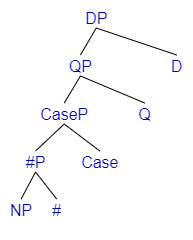
Japanese Nominal Structure as proposed by Akira Watanabe

In generative grammar, one proposed structure of Japanese nominal phrases includes three layers of functional projections: #P, CaseP, and QuantifierP. Here, #P is placed above NP to explain Japanese's lack of plural morphology, and to make clear the # head is the stem of such morphology. This structure relies on movement in order to satisfy agreement via extended projection principle features.

== Substitution of counters ==
In Japanese, virtually all nouns must use a counter to express number because Japanese lacks singular/plural morphology. In this sense, virtually all Japanese nouns are mass nouns. This grammatical feature can result in situations where one is unable to express the number of a particular object in a syntactically correct way because one does not know, or cannot remember, the appropriate counting word. With quantities from one to ten, this problem can often be sidestepped by using the traditional numerals (see below), which can quantify many nouns without help. For example, "four apples" is りんご四個 ringo yonko where 個 ko is the counter, but can also be expressed, using the traditional numeral four, as りんご四つ ringo yottsu. These traditional numerals cannot be used to count all nouns, however; some, including nouns for people and animals, require a proper counter (except for 1 and 2 people, which virtually always use variants of the traditional numerals; see exceptions).

Some of the more common counters may substitute for less common ones. For example, 匹 hiki (see below) is often used for all animals, regardless of size. However, many speakers will prefer to use the traditionally correct counter, 頭 tō, when speaking of larger animals such as horses. This yields a range of possible counters, with differing degrees of usage and acceptability – for example, when ordering kushikatsu (fried skewers), one may order them as 二串 futa-kushi (two skewers), 二本 ni-hon (two sticks), or 二つ futa-tsu (two items), in decreasing order of precision.

Counters may be intentionally misused for humorous, stupid, or insulting effects. For example, the phrase 男一匹 otoko ippiki ("one man [like an animal]"), uses 匹 hiki, the counter for animals, instead of the typical counters for people.

== Table of traditional numerals ==
Numeral	Japanese	Pronunciation (romaji)	Writing (hiragana)
1	一つ	hitotsu	ひとつ
2	二つ	futatsu	ふたつ
3	三つ	mittsu	みっつ
4	四つ	yottsu	よっつ
5	五つ	itsutsu	いつつ
6	六つ	muttsu	むっつ
7	七つ	nanatsu	ななつ
8	八つ	yattsu	やっつ
9	九つ	kokonotsu	ここのつ
10	十	tō	とお

== Common counters by category ==
This is a selective list of some of the more commonly used counting words.

Pronunciation	Japanese	Use
People and Things
ぶ bu	部	Copies of a magazine or newspaper, or other packets of papers
だい dai	台	Cars, bicycles, machines, mechanical devices, household appliances
はい hai, ぱい pai, ばい bai	杯	Cups and glasses of drink, spoonsful; cuttlefish, octopuses, crabs, squid, abalone, boats (slang)
ひき hiki, ぴき piki, びき biki	匹	Small animals, insects, fish, reptiles, amphibians, oni (demons/ogres)
ほん hon, ぽん pon, ぼん bon	本	frequently used word Long, thin objects: rivers, roads, train tracks, ties, pencils, bottles, guitars; also, metaphorically, telephone calls, train or bus routes, movies (see also: tsūwa), points or bounds in sports events. Although 本 also means "book", the counter for (modern codex format) books is satsu.
かい kai, がい gai	階	Number of floors, stories
こ ko	個, 箇, 个, or ヶ	frequently used word Implies that the item is small and/or round. 個 is also used for military units.
まい mai	枚	frequently used word Thin, flat objects: sheets of paper, photographs, plates, articles of clothing (see also: chaku)
めい mei	名	People (polite) (名 means "name")
めん men	面	Broad, flat objects: mirrors, boards for board games (chess, igo, shogi), stages of computer games, walls of a room, tennis courts
にん nin	人	People (but see table of exceptions below)
り ri	り or 人	People, used in the words 一人 (ひとり) and 二人 (ふたり)
さつ satsu	冊	Books
つ tsu	つ	frequently used word General-purpose counter, used as part of the indigenous Japanese numbers 一つ ("one thing"), 二つ ("two things"), 三つ ("three things"), etc.
わ wa	話	Stories, episodes of TV series, etc.
Time, Calendar, etc.
びょう byō	秒	Seconds
ふん fun, ぷん pun	分	Minutes
がつ gatsu, also つき tsuki	月	Months of the year. Month-long periods when read tsuki (see also: kagetsu)
はく haku, ぱく paku	泊	Nights of a stay
じ ji	時	Hours of the day
じかん jikan	時間	Hour-long periods
か ka	日	Day of the month
かげつ kagetsu	ヶ月, 箇月	Month-long periods (see also: gatsu). 箇 is normally abbreviated using a small katakana ヶ in modern Japanese. Alternatively 個, hiragana か, small katakana ヵ and full-size katakana カ & ケ can also be seen, although only か is similarly frequent.
ねん nen	年	Years, school years (grades); not years of age
にち nichi	日	Days of the month (but see table of exceptions below)
さい sai	歳 (or 才)	Years of age (才 is used informally as a ryakuji)
しゅう shū	週	Weeks
Extent, Frequency, etc.
ばい bai	倍	Multiples, -fold as in "twofold"
ばん ban	番	Position, turn, sports matches
ど do, also たび tabi	度	frequently used word Occurrences, number of times, degrees of temperature or angle (see also: kai).
じょう jō	畳	Tatami mats. The kanji 畳 is also read tatami and is the same one used for the mats. The room size of a washitsu in Japan is given as a number of mats, for example 4½ jō
かい kai	回	frequently used word Occurrences, number of times (see also: do)

== Extended list of counters ==
This list also includes some counters and usages that are rarely used or not widely known; other words can also be used as counters more sporadically.

Pronunciation	Japanese	Use
ば ba	場	Scene of a play
ばい bai	倍	Multiples, -fold as in "twofold"
ばん ban	晩	Nights (see also: ya)
ばん ban	番	Position, platform for a train line, turn, sports matches
び bi	尾	Small fish and shrimps (used in the fish trade; most people say hiki instead)
ぶ bu	部	Copies of a magazine or newspaper, or other packets of papers
ぶん bun	文	Sentences
びょう byō	秒	Seconds
ちゃく chaku	着	Suits of clothing (see also: mai)
ちょう chō	挺	Long, narrow things such as guns, sticks of ink, palanquins, rickshaws, violins
ちょう chō	丁	Sheets, pages, leaves, tools, scissors, saws, trousers, pistols, cakes of tofu, town blocks, servings at a restaurant
ちょう chō	町	Town blocks
だい dai	代	Generations, historical periods, reigns
だい dai	台	Cars, bicycles, machines, mechanical devices, household appliances
だん dan	段	levels, ranks, steps (of stairs).
だんらく danraku	段落	Paragraphs
ど do, also たび tabi	度	Occurrences, number of times, degrees of temperature or angle (see also: kai).
ふで fude	筆	Sequences of letters or drawings that you write or draw without removing your pen off the paper. Not to be confused with hitsu (筆) below.
ふく fuku, ぷく puku	服	Bowls of matcha (powdered green tea); packets or doses of powdered medicine; puffs (of, e.g., a cigarette); rests or breaks
ふく fuku, ぷく puku	幅	Hanging scrolls (kakejiku)
ふん fun, ぷん pun	分	Minutes
ふり furi	振	Swords
がっきゅう gakkyū	学級	Classes (in pre-university education)
がつ gatsu, also つき tsuki	月	Months of the year. Month-long periods when read tsuki (see also: kagetsu)
ご go	語	Words
ごう gō	合	small container (e.g. rice cup, sake cup)
ごん gon, also こと koto	言	Words
ぐ gu	具	Suits of armour, sets of furniture
ぎょう gyō	行	Lines of text
はく haku	泊	Nights of a stay
はい hai, ぱい pai, ばい bai	杯	Cups and glasses of drink, spoonfuls, cuttlefish, octopuses, crabs, squid, abalone, boats (slang)
はい hai	敗	Losses (sports bouts)
はこ hako	箱	Boxes
はり hari	張	Umbrellas, parasols, tents
はしら hashira	柱	gods, memorial tablets
はつ hatsu, ぱつ patsu	発	Gunshots, bullets, aerial fireworks; orgasms, sex acts
ひき hiki, ぴき piki	匹	Small animals, insects, fish, reptiles, amphibians, oni (ogres)
ひん hin, ぴん pin	品	Parts of a meal, courses (see also: shina)
ひつ hitsu, ぴつ pitsu	筆	pieces of land and number of people
ほ ho, ぽ po	歩	Number of (foot)steps
ほん hon, ぽん pon, ぼん bon	本	Long, thin objects: rivers, roads, train tracks, ties, pencils, bottles, guitars; also, metaphorically, telephone calls (see also: tsūwa), train or bus routes, movies, home runs, points or bounds in sports events. Although 本 also means "book", the counter for books is satsu.
ひょう hyō, ぴょう pyō	票	Votes
ひょうし hyōshi, びょうし byōshi	拍子	Musical beats
じ ji	字	Letters, kanji, kana
じ ji	児	Children. As in "father of two (children)", etc.
じ ji	時	Hours of the day
じかん jikan	時間	Hour-long periods
じょう jō	畳	Tatami mats. The kanji 畳 is also read tatami and is the same one used for the mats. The room size of a washitsu in Japan is given as a number of mats, for example 4½ yo jō han
じょう jō	錠	Pills/capsules
じょう jō	条	Articles of law, thin objects, rays or streams of light, streaks of smoke or lightning
か ka	日	Day of the month
か ka	架	Frames
か ka	課	Lessons
かぶ kabu	株	Company shares; nursery trees
かげつ kagetsu	ヶ月, 箇月	Month-long periods (see also: gatsu). 箇 is normally abbreviated using a small katakana ヶ in modern Japanese. Alternatively 個, hiragana か, small katakana ヵ and full-size katakana カ & ケ can also be seen, although only か is similarly frequent.
かい kai	回	Occurrences, number of times (see also: do)
かい kai, がい gai	階	Number of floors, storeys
かこく kakoku	ヶ国, 箇国	Countries
かこくご kakokugo	ヶ国語, 箇国語	(National) languages
かく kaku	画	Strokes in kanji
かん kan	貫	Pieces of nigiri-zushi
かん kan	艦	Warships
けいとう keitou	系統	Bus routes
けん ken	件	Abstract matters and cases
けん ken, げん gen	軒	Houses
き ki	機	Aircraft, machines
き ki	基	Graves, wreaths, CPUs, reactors, elevators, dams
きん kin	斤	Loaves of bread
きれ kire	切れ	Slices (of bread, cake, sashimi etc.)
こ ko	個, 箇, 个, or ヶ	General measure word, used when there is no specific counter. 個 is also used for military units.
こ ko	戸	Houses (戸 means "door")
こう kō	校	Schools
こう kō	稿	Drafts of a manuscript
こう kō	行	Banks
こま koma	齣, コマ	Frames, panels. 齣 is virtually unused nowadays.
こん kon	献	shots (of drink)
く ku	区	Sections, city districts
く ku	句	Haiku, senryū
くち kuchi	口	(Bank) accounts, donations (口 means "opening" or "entrance")
くみ kumi	組	Groups, a pair of people (twins, a husband and a wife, dancers, etc.)
くらす kurasu	クラス	School classes
きゃく kyaku	脚	Desks, chairs, long-stemmed glasses
きゃく kyaku	客	Pairs of cup and saucer
きょく kyoku	曲	Pieces of music
きょく kyoku	局	Board game matches (chess, igo, shogi, mahjong); radio stations, television stations
まい mai	枚	Thin, flat objects, sheets of paper, photographs, plates, articles of clothing (see also: chaku)
まき maki or かん kan	巻	Rolls, scrolls, kan for volumes of book
まく maku	幕	Theatrical acts
めい mei	名	People (polite) (名 means "name")
めん men	面	Mirrors, boards for board games (chess, igo, shogi), stages of computer games, walls of a room, tennis courts
もん mon	門	Cannons
もん mon	問	Questions
ねん nen	年	Years, school years (grades); not years of age
にち nichi	日	Days of the month (but see table of exceptions below)
にん nin	人	People (but see table of exceptions below)
にんまえ ninmae	人前	Food portions (without exceptions, unlike nin above)
おり ori	折	Boxes made of folded paper (compare to hako above, which refers to boxes in general)
ぺーじ pēji	ページ, 頁	Pages
れい rei	例	Cases, examples
れい rei	礼	Bows during worship at a shrine
れん ren	連	finger rings or necklace loops
り ri	り or 人	People, used in the words 一人 (ひとり) and 二人 (ふたり).
りん rin	輪	Wheels, flowers
りょう ryō	両	Railway cars
さい sai	才 or 歳	Years of age
さお sao	棹	Chests of drawers, flags
さつ satsu	冊	Books
せき seki	席	Seats, rakugo shows, (drinking) parties
せき seki	隻	Ships, half of a pair (e.g., half of a folding screen), item carried in a bundle (fish, birds, arrows etc.)
しな shina	品	Parts of a meal, courses (see also: hin)
しゃ sha	社	used for businesses, i.e. 会社
しき shiki	式	Sets of things, such as documents or furniture
しょう shō	勝	Wins (sports bouts)
しゅ shu	首	Tanka
しゅう shū	週	Weeks
しゅるい shurui or しゅ shu	種類 or 種	Kinds, species
そく soku	足	Pairs of footwear, pairs of socks, stockings, tabi
そう sō	双	Pairs
たば taba	束	bundles (of banknotes), bunches (of flowers, vegetables), sheaves
たい tai	体	Images, statues, person's remains, dolls, androids, humanoid robots
たわら tawara	俵	Bags of rice
てき teki	滴	Drops of liquid
てん ten	点	Points, dots, pieces of a set
とう tō	頭	Large animals, cattle, elephants, whales, dolphins, butterflies (頭 means "head")
とき toki	時	Time periods, a sixth of either day or night (in the traditional, obsolete way of telling time). See also: jikan
とおり tōri	通り	Combinations, puzzle solutions
つ tsu	つ	Used as part of the indigenous Japanese numbers 一つ, 二つ, 三つ etc.
つう tsū	通	Letters
つぼ tsubo	坪	Commonly used unit of area equal to 3.3 square metres.
つぶ tsubu	粒	Almonds, grain
つうわ tsūwa	通話	Telephone calls (see also: hon)
わ wa, ば ba, ぱ pa	羽	Birds, rabbits. 羽 means "feather" or "wing."
わ wa	把	Bundles
わ wa	話	Stories, episodes of TV series, etc.
や ya	夜	Nights (see also: ban)
ぜん zen	膳	Pairs of chopsticks; bowls of rice

== Euphonic changes ==
Systematic changes occur when particular numbers precede counters that begin with certain phonemes. For example, 一 ichi + 回 kai → 一回 ikkai. The details are listed in the table below.

This can be the result of the morpho-phonological phenomenon of historical sound changes, as shown by the voicing of 匹 hiki:

六 + 匹 → 六匹
roku + hiki → roppiki
six + {small animal}.CL {} {}

change from glottal [h] to bilabial [p].

It may also be that some counters carry features which are responsible for such euphonic changes for singular, dual, and plural nouns, where singular carries [+singular, −augmented] features, dual carries [−singular, −augmented] features, and plural carries [−singular, +augmented] features.

一人
hito-ri
one-person.CL

二人
futa-ri
two-person.CL

三人
san-nin
three-person.CL

These changes are followed fairly consistently but exceptions and variations between speakers do exist. Where variations are common, more than one alternative is listed.

Jū is replaced by either ju- or ji- (じゅっ/じっ) followed by a doubled consonant before the voiceless consonants as shown in the table. Ji- is the older form, but it has been replaced by ju- in the speech of recent generations.

Numeral	k- (か きゃ etc.)	s/sh- (さ しゃ etc.)	t/ch- (た ちゃ etc.)	h- (は ひ へ ほ ひゃ ひゅ ひょ)	f- (ふ)	p- (ぱ etc.)	w- (わ)
1 ichi	ikk- いっか	iss- いっさ	itt- いった	ipp- いっぱ	ipp- いっぷ	ipp- いっぱ	
3 san				sanb- さんば	sanp- さんぷ		sanb- さんば
4 yon				yonh- よんは yonp- よんぱ	yonf- よんふ yonp- よんぷ		yow- よわ yonw- よんわ yonb- よんば
6 roku	rokk- ろっか			ropp- ろっぱ	ropp- ろっぷ	ropp- ろっぱ	rokuw- ろくわ ropp- ろっぱ
8 hachi	hakk- はっか	hass- はっさ	hatt- はった	happ- はっぱ	happ- はっぷ	happ- はっぱ	happ- はっぱ hachiw- はちわ
10 jū	jikk- じっか jukk- じゅっか	jiss- じっさ juss- じゅっさ	jitt- じった jutt- じゅった	jipp- じっぱ jupp- じゅっぱ	jipp- じっぷ jupp- じゅっぷ	jipp- じっぱ jupp- じゅっぱ	jipp- じっぱ
100 hyaku	hyakk- ひゃっか			hyapp- ひゃっぱ	hyapp- ひゃっぷ	hyapp- ひゃっぱ	
1000 sen				senb- せんば	senp- せんぷ		
10000 man				manb- まんば	manp- まんぷ		
何 nan				nanb- なんば	nanp- なんぷ		

== Exceptions ==
The traditional numbers are used by and for young children to give their ages, instead of using the age counter 歳 (or 才) sai.

Some counters, notably 日 nichi and 人 nin, use the traditional numerals for some numbers as shown in the table below. Other uses of traditional numbers are usually restricted to certain phrases, such as 一月 hitotsuki and 二月 futatsuki (one and two months respectively), 一言 hitokoto (a single word) and 一度 hitotabi (once).

Sometimes common numbers that have a derived meaning are written using different kanji. For example, hitori (alone) is written 独り, and futatabi (once more, another time) is normally written 再び instead of 二度. The counter for months kagetsu (derived from kanji 箇月) is commonly written ヶ月.

Nana and shichi are alternatives for 7, yon and shi are alternatives for 4, and kyū and ku are alternatives for 9. In those three pairs of options, nana, yon and kyū respectively are more commonly used. Some counters, however, notably 人 nin (people), 月 gatsu (month of the year), 日 ka/nichi (day of the month, days), 時 ji (time of day) and 時間 jikan (hours) take certain alternatives only. These are shown in the table below.

While 回 kai (occurrences) and 銭 sen (0.01 yen, now rarely used) follow the euphonic changes listed above, homophones 階 kai (stories/floors of a building) and 千 sen (1000) are slightly different as shown below, although these differences are not followed by all speakers. Thus 三階 ("third floor") can be read either sankai or sangai, while 三回 ("three times") can only be read sankai.

Numeral	つ tsu	日 nichi	人 nin	年 nen	月 gatsu	時 ji	分 fun	百 hyaku	千 sen	歳 sai	階 kai
1	ひとつ hitotsu	tsuitachi (Note: But when counting number of days rather than days of the month, ichinichi is used. Ippi is also heard.)	hitori				ippun		issen	issai	ikkai
2	ふたつ futatsu	futsuka	futari								
3	みっつ mittsu	mikka					sanpun	sanbyaku	sanzen		sangai
4	よっつ yottsu	yokka	yonin (Note: In remote rural areas (e.g. Northern Honshu and Eastern Hokkaido) older speakers might use yottari.)	yonen	shigatsu	yoji	yonpun				
5	いつつ itsutsu	itsuka									
6	むっつ muttsu	muika					roppun	roppyaku			rokkai
7	ななつ nanatsu	nanoka	shichinin		shichigatsu	shichiji					
8	やっつ yattsu	yōka					happun	happyaku	hassen	hassai	hakkai
9	ここのつ kokonotsu	kokonoka			kugatsu	kuji					
10	とお tō	tōka					jippun			jissai	jikkai
14		jūyokka	jūyonin	jūyonen		jūyoji	jūyonpun				
17		jūshichinichi	jūshichinin			jūshichiji					
19		jūkunichi				jūkuji					
20		hatsuka								hatachi	
24		nijūyokka	nijūyonin	nijūyonen		nijūyoji	nijūyonpun				
何 nan			(Note: Both 幾人 ikunin and 何人 nannin are used to mean "how many people".)				nanpun	nanbyaku	nanzen		nangai

== Ordinal numbers ==
In general, the counter words mentioned above are cardinal numbers, in that they indicate quantity. To transform a counter word into an ordinal number that denotes position in a sequence, 目 me is added to the end of the counter. Thus "one time" would be translated as 一回 ikkai, whereas "the first time" would be translated as 一回目 ikkaime.

This rule is inconsistent, however, as counters without the me suffix are often used interchangeably with cardinal and ordinal meanings. For example, 三階 sangai can mean both "three floors" and "third floor."

== Periods of time ==
To express a period of time one may add 間 kan to the following words: 秒 byō, 分 fun, 時 ji, 日 nichi (and its irregular readings aside from tsuitachi), 週 shū, ヶ月 kagetsu and 年 nen. Usage varies depending on the word, though. For example, omitting kan in the case of 時間 jikan would be a mistake, whereas shūkan and shū are both in frequent use. In addition, kagetsukan is rarely heard due to essentially being superfluous, the ka already functioning to express the length.

== Counter for rabbits ==
The counter for rabbits is -wa (羽), which is the same as the counter for birds. Usually, -hiki (匹) is used for "small-to-medium-size animals", therefore, the counter for rabbits is an exception. There are many theories about why -wa (羽) is used for rabbits instead of -hiki (匹).

One of the theories is that in Edo-era, eating four-legged animals was strictly forbidden by the government, and people were not allowed to consume rabbit meat. Then, people started to categorize rabbits as birds so that they could consume rabbit meat, and the counter was also changed from -hiki (匹) to -wa (羽). Another theory is that taste of rabbit meat is similar to bird meat, and in addition, the rabbits were captured using a net just like birds so -wa (羽) is used instead of -hiki (匹). Takemitsu says that the origin of the word rabbit, 兎 usagi, is 羽 u which describes birds feather: therefore, the counter, -wa (羽), is used for rabbits.

== See also ==
- Measure words
- Japanese units of measurement

== Bibliography ==
- Rubin, Jay (January 2004) [January 2002]. Making Sense of Japanese: What the Textbooks Don’t Tell You 日(に)本(ほん)語(ご)の秘(ひ)訣(けつ) (3rd ed.). Kodansha International. ISBN 4-7700-2802-4.
