= Zeniya Gohei =

Japanese merchant and engineer

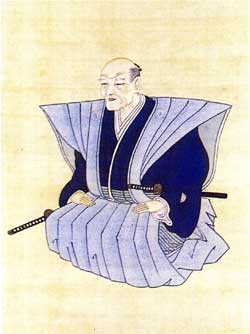
Zeniya Gohei

Zeniya Gohei (銭屋 五兵衛; Japanese pronunciation: [dze.ɲi.ja (|) ɡoꜜ.hei, -heː], 1774–1852) was a Japanese merchant and engineer in the Edo period.

Gohei was born to a family of money-changers in Kaga province.

== Coastal shipping ==
Gohei was put in charge of developing a coastal shipping fleet (kitamae ships) for the Tokugawa shogunate, and he became very rich from trading, especially rice and lumber.

== Land reclamation project ==
In the summer of 1851, Gohei attempted a land reclamation project in Kahoku Lake, which is north of Kanazawa on the Sea of Japan. He planned to create rice paddies, but the project failed.

In mid-1852, a large number of dead fish floated to the surface of the inlet near the worksite, and some local people died after eating the dead fish. Gohei and his family were deemed responsible, and they were imprisoned. It is likely that these criminal charges were contrived as a subterfuge which enabled the clan to seize his considerable wealth.

The seventy-eight-year-old Gohei died within three months of his incarceration.
