= Utagoyomi: Onatsu Seijūrō =

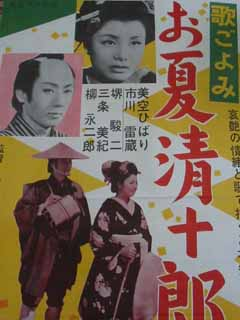
- Japanese movie poster
- Directed by: Taizo Fuyushima
- Produced by: Shin Geijutsu Production
- Release date: November 1, 1954
- Running time: 100 minutes
- Country: Japan
- Language: Japanese

Utagoyomi: Onatsu Seijūrō (歌ごよみ お夏清十郎) is a 1954 black-and-white Japanese film directed by Taizō Fuyushima.

== Cast ==
- Ichikawa Raizō
